Relations between the United Kingdom and the United States have ranged from close allies to military opponents since the latter declared independence from the former in the late 18th century. The Thirteen British Colonies that seceded from the Kingdom of Great Britain in 1776 fought a subsequent revolutionary war and a theatre of the Napoleonic Wars in 1812. During the World Wars the United States had surpassed the United Kingdom as the world's leading power, having overshadowed it economically from the late 19th century. Since 1940 the countries have been close military allies enjoying the Special Relationship built as wartime allies and NATO partners.

They are bound together by shared history, an overlap in religion, common language, legal system and kinship ties that reach back hundreds of years, including kindred, ancestral lines among English Americans, Scottish Americans, Welsh Americans, Cornish Americans, Scotch-Irish Americans, Irish Americans, and American Britons. Today, large numbers of expatriates live in both countries.

In the early 21st century, Britain affirmed its relationship with the United States as its "most important bilateral partnership" in the current British foreign policy, and the American foreign policy also affirms its relationship with Britain as its most important relationship, as evidenced in aligned political affairs, mutual cooperation in the areas of trade, commerce, finance, technology, academics, as well as the arts and sciences; the sharing of government and military intelligence, and joint combat operations and peacekeeping missions carried out between the United States Armed Forces and the British Armed Forces. Canada has historically been the largest importer of US goods and the principal exporter of goods to the United States. As of January 2015, the United Kingdom was fifth in terms of exports and seventh in terms of import of goods. In long-term perspective, the historian Paul Johnson has called the United Kingdom–United States relations "cornerstone of the modern, democratic world order".

The two countries also have had a significant impact on the cultures of many other countries. They are the two main nodes of the Anglosphere, with a combined population of just under 400 million in 2019. Together, they have given the English language a dominant role in many sectors of the modern world.

Special Relationship

The Special Relationship characterises the exceptionally close political, diplomatic, cultural, economic, military, and historical relations between the two countries. It is specially used for relations since 1940.

History

Origins

After several failed attempts, the first permanent English settlement in mainland North America was established in 1607 at Jamestown in the Colony and Dominion of Virginia. By 1624, the Colony and Dominion of Virginia ceased to be a charter colony administered by the Virginia Company of London and became a crown colony. In 1630 the Puritans established the Massachusetts Bay Colony; they emphasize not only a pure religiosity, but also education and entrepreneurship.

Smaller colonies followed in Province of Maine (1622), Province of Maryland (1632), Colony of Rhode Island and Providence Plantations (1636) and Connecticut Colony (1636). Later came the founding of Province of Carolina (1663) (divided in 1729 into the Province of North Carolina and the Province of South Carolina). The Province of New Hampshire was founded in 1691. Finally came the Province of Georgia in 1732 founded and controlled by James Oglethorpe.

The British created the Province of New York from the conquered Dutch colony of New Netherland. In 1674, the Province of New Jersey was split off from New York. In 1681 William Penn was awarded a royal charter by King Charles II to found Province of Pennsylvania. It attracted Penn's fellow Quakers, as well as many German farmers and Scots-Irish backwoodsman.

The colonies each reported separately to London. There was a failed effort to group the colonies into the Dominion of New England, 1686–89.

Migration

During the 17th century, about 350,000 English and Welsh migrants arrived as permanent residents in the Thirteen Colonies. In the century after the Acts of Union this was surpassed in rate and number by Scottish and Irish migrants.

During British colonization, liberal administrative, juridical, and market institutions were introduced, positively associated with socioeconomic development. At the same time, colonial policy was also quasi-mercantilist, encouraging trade within the Empire, discouraging trade with other powers, and discouraging the rise of manufacturing in the colonies, which had been established to increase the trade and wealth of the mother country. Britain made much greater profits from the sugar trade of its commercial colonies in the Caribbean.

The colonial period also saw the introduction of indentured servitude and slavery. All of the Thirteen Colonies were involved in the slave trade. Slaves in the Middle Colonies and New England Colonies typically worked as house servants, artisans, laborers and craftsmen. Early on, slaves in the Southern Colonies worked primarily in agriculture, on farms and plantations growing indigo, rice, cotton, and tobacco for export.

The French and Indian War, fought between 1754 and 1763, was the North American theatre of the Seven Years' War. The conflict, the fourth such colonial war between France and Britain in North America, resulted in the British acquisition of New France from the French. Under the Treaty of Paris signed in 1763, the French ceded control of French Louisiana east of the Mississippi River to the British, which became known as the Indian Reserve in the Royal Proclamation of 1763.

Religion

The religious ties between the homeland and the colonies were pronounced. Most of the churches were transplants from Europe.  The Puritans of New England seldom kept in touch with nonconformists in England. Much closer were the transatlantic relationships maintained by the Quakers, especially in Pennsylvania. The Methodists also maintained close ties.

The Anglican Church was officially established in the Southern colonies, which meant that local taxes paid the salary of the minister, the parish had civic responsibilities such as poor relief, and the local gentry controlled the parish. The church was disestablished during the American Revolution. The Anglican churches in America were under the authority of the Bishop of London, and there was a long debate over whether to establish an Anglican bishop in America. The other Protestants blocked any such appointment. After the Revolution the newly formed Episcopal Church selected its own bishop and kept its distance from London.

American Revolution

The Thirteen Colonies gradually obtained more self-government. British mercantilist policies became more stringent, benefiting the mother country which resulted in trade restrictions, thereby limiting the growth of the colonial economy and artificially constraining colonial merchants' earning potential. The sums were small but Parliament insisted that it was in final command and could impose taxes at any time. Tensions escalated from 1765 to 1775 over issues of taxation without any American representation in Parliament. Starting with from the Boston Massacre of 1770 when seven men of the 29th Regiment of Foot opened fired on a crowd of hostile Bostonians who were harassing them, talk of revolution consumed the outraged colonists. Parliament imposed a series of taxes such as the Stamp Act, and later the Tea Act of 1773, against which an angry mob of colonists protested in the Boston Tea Party by dumping chests of East India Company tea into Boston Harbor. Parliament responded by passing what the colonists termed the Intolerable Acts in 1774, which were designed to strip away self-government in Massachusetts. The thirteen colonies stood together. When the first shots fired in the Battles of Lexington and Concord in 1775 there began the American War of Independence.  The Patriots then slowly took control of all thirteen colonies, ejecting all British officials by mid-1776. While the goal of attaining independence was sought by a majority known as Patriots, a minority known as the Loyalists wished to remain as British subjects loyal to the king. When the Second Continental Congress convened in Philadelphia in May 1775, deliberations conducted by notable figures such as Benjamin Franklin, Thomas Jefferson, John Hancock, Samuel Adams, and John Adams  resulted in a decision for full independence. Thus, the Declaration of Independence, unanimously ratified on July 4, 1776, was a radical and decisive break. The United States of America became the first colony in the world to successfully achieve independence in the modern era. According to R. R. Palmer the new American nation:
 inspired the sense of a new era. It added a new content to the concept of progress. It gave a whole new dimension to ideas of liberty and equality made familiar in the Enlightenment. It got people into the habit of thinking more concretely about political questions, and made them more readily critical of their own governments and society. It dethroned England and set up America as a model for those seeking a better world.

In 1775, the Patriots established the Continental Army as a defense force. The British Army returned in force in August 1776, and captured New York City, which became their base until the war ended in 1783. The British, using their powerful navy, could capture major ports, but 90% of the Americans lived in rural areas where they had full control. After the capture of a British invasion force moving down from Canada in the Saratoga campaign of 1777, France entered the war as an ally of the US, and added the Netherlands and Spain as French allies. Britain suffered casualties which it could not replace and had no major allies and few friends in Europe. The British strategy was then refocused on the South, where they expected large numbers of Loyalists would fight alongside the regulars. Far fewer Loyalists took up arms than Britain needed; royal efforts to control the countryside in the South failed. When the British army tried to return to New York, its rescue fleet was turned back by the French Navy and its army was captured by combined French-American forces under General George Washington at the Siege of Yorktown in October 1781. That effectively conceded American success.  Opinion in Scotland often favoured the American cause, or criticised the poor performance of the British army.

Peace treaty

The Treaty of Paris ended the war in 1783 on terms quite favourable to the new nation.

The key events were in September 1782, when the French Foreign Minister Vergennes proposed a solution that was strongly opposed by his ally the United States. France was exhausted by the war, and everyone wanted peace except Spain, which insisted on continuing the war until it captured Gibraltar from the British. Vergennes came up with a deal that Spain would accept instead of Gibraltar. The United States would gain its independence but be confined to the area east of the Appalachian Mountains. Britain would take the area north of the Ohio River. In the area south of that would be set up an independent Indian state under Spanish control. It would be an Indian barrier state. The Americans realised that French friendship was worthless during these negotiations: they could get a better deal directly from London. John Jay promptly told the British that he was willing to negotiate directly with them, cutting off France and Spain. The British Prime Minister Lord Shelburne agreed. He was in full charge of the British negotiations and he now saw a chance to split the United States away from France and make the new country a valuable economic partner. The western terms were that the United States would gain all of the area east of the Mississippi River, north of Florida, and south of Canada. The northern boundary would be almost the same as today. The United States would gain fishing rights off the Atlantic coast of Canada, and agreed to allow British merchants and Loyalists to try to recover their property. It was a highly favourable treaty for the United States, and deliberately so from the British point of view. Shelburne foresaw a highly profitable two-way trade between Britain and the rapidly growing United States, which indeed came to pass.

End of the Revolution
The treaty was finally ratified in 1784. The British evacuated their soldiers and civilians in New York City, Charleston and Savannah in late 1783. Over 80 percent of the half-million Loyalists remained in the United States and became American citizens. The others mostly went to Canada, and referred to themselves as the United Empire Loyalists. Merchants and men of affairs often went to Britain to reestablish their business connections. Rich southern Loyalists, taking their slaves with them, typically headed to plantations in the West Indies. The British also evacuated about 3,000 Black Loyalists, former slaves who had escaped from their American masters and joined the British; they went to Nova Scotia. Many found it inhospitable and went to Sierra Leone, a newly established British colony in Africa.

The new nation gained control of nearly all the land east of the Mississippi and south of the St. Lawrence River and the Great Lakes. The British colonies of East and West Florida were given to Spain as its reward. The Native American tribes allied with Britain struggled in the aftermath; the British ignored them at the Peace conference, and most came under American control unless they moved to Canada or to Spanish territory. The British kept forts in the Northwest Territory (what is today the American Midwest, especially in Michigan and Wisconsin), where they supplied weapons to Indian tribes.

1783–1807: Role of Jay Treaty

Trade resumed between the two nations when the war ended. The British allowed all exports to America but forbade some American food exports to its colonies in the West Indies. British exports reached £3.7 million, compared with imports of only £750,000. The imbalance caused a shortage of gold in the US.

In 1785, John Adams became the first American plenipotentiary minister, to the Court of St James's. King George III received him graciously. In 1791, Great Britain sent its first diplomatic envoy, George Hammond, to the United States.

When Great Britain and France went to war in 1793, relations between the United States and Great Britain also verged on war. Tensions were resolved when the Jay Treaty was approved in 1795. It established a decade of peace and prosperous trade relations.  The historian Marshall Smelser argues that the treaty effectively postponed war with Britain, or at least postponed it until the United States was strong enough to handle it.

According to American historian Samuel Flagg Bemis, the US had a list of outstanding issues:
 The British Army operated five forts in territory assigned to the US in the 1783 peace treaty in modern-day Michigan, Ohio and New York.
 The British were supporting Indian conflicts with American settlers in the Northwest (Ohio and Michigan).
 The British were continuing to impress sailors into British service who were US citizens.
 American merchants wanted compensation for 250 merchant ships which the British had seized in 1793 and 1794.
 Southern interests wanted monetary compensation for the holders of freed slaves evacuated by the British in 1783.
 American merchants wanted the British West Indies to be reopened to American trade.
 The boundary with Canada was vague in many places, and needed to be more sharply delineated.

The final treaty settled some but not all of the issues. The Federalist Party called for the Senate to ratify the Jay treaty, but the Republican Party was strongly opposed.  Led by Thomas Jefferson and James Madison, the Republicans strongly favored France and believed Britain was ideologically opposed to American values. Close ties with London would doom republicanism in America. President George Washington waited until the last moment then made the decisive intervention so the Treaty was ratified by exactly a 2/3 vote, and the necessary money was appropriated. The result was two decades of peace in a time of world war. The peace lasted until the Republicans came to power and Jefferson rejected a new treaty and began an economic attack on Britain.

Bradford Perkins argues that the treaty was the first to establish a special relationship between Britain and the United States, with a second installment under Lord Salisbury. In his view, the treaty worked for ten years to secure peace between Britain and America: "The decade may be characterised as the period of "The First Rapprochement." As Perkins concludes, "For about ten years there was peace on the frontier, joint recognition of the value of commercial intercourse, and even, by comparison with both preceding and succeeding epochs, a muting of strife over ship seizures and impressment. Two controversies with France… pushed the English-speaking powers even more closely together." Starting at swords' point in 1794, the Jay treaty reversed the tensions, Perkins concludes: "Through a decade of world war and peace, successive governments on both sides of the Atlantic were able to bring about and preserve a cordiality which often approached genuine friendship."

Historian Joseph Ellis finds the terms of the treaty "one-sided in Britain's favor", but asserts a consensus of historians agrees that it was

"a shrewd bargain for the United States. It bet, in effect, on England rather than France as the hegemonic European power of the future, which proved prophetic. It recognised the massive dependence of the American economy on trade with England. In a sense it was a precocious preview of the Monroe Doctrine (1823), for it linked American security and economic development to the British fleet, which provided a protective shield of incalculable value throughout the nineteenth century. Mostly, it postponed war with England until America was economically and politically more capable of fighting one."

The US proclaimed its neutrality in the wars between Britain and France (1793–1815), and profited greatly by selling food, timber and other supplies to both sides.

Thomas Jefferson had bitterly opposed the Jay Treaty because he feared it would strengthen anti-republican political enemies. When Jefferson became president in 1801, he did not repudiate the treaty. He kept the Federalist minister, Rufus King in London to negotiate a successful resolution to outstanding issues regarding cash payments and boundaries. The amity broke down in 1805, as relations turned increasingly hostile as a prelude to the War of 1812. Jefferson rejected a renewal of the Jay Treaty in the Monroe–Pinkney Treaty of 1806 as negotiated by his diplomats and agreed to by London; he never sent it to the Senate.

The transatlantic slave trade was largely suppressed after Great Britain passed the Abolition of the Slave Trade Act in 1807. At the urging of President Jefferson, the United States passed the Act Prohibiting Importation of Slaves in 1807, to take effect January 1, 1808.

War of 1812

The United States imposed a trade embargo, namely the Embargo Act of 1807, in retaliation for Britain's blockade of France, which involved the visit and search of neutral merchantmen, and resulted in the suppression of Franco-United States trade for the duration of the Napoleonic Wars. The Royal Navy also boarded American ships and impressed sailors suspected of being British deserters. Expansion into the Midwest (i.e. Ohio to Wisconsin) was hindered by Native American tribes given munitions and support by British agents. Indeed, Britain's goal was the creation of an independent Indian state to block expansion westward by the US.

After diplomacy and the boycott had failed, the issue of national honour and independence came to the fore. Brands says, "The other war hawks spoke of the struggle with Britain as a second war of independence; [Andrew] Jackson, who still bore scars from the first war of independence held that view with special conviction. The approaching conflict was about violations of American rights, but it was also vindication of American identity."

Finally in June 1812 President James Madison called for war, and overcame the opposition of business interests in the Northeast. The US strategy called for a war against British shipping and especially cutting off food shipments to the British sugar plantations in the West Indies. Conquest of the northern colonies that later became Canada was a tactic designed to give the US a strong bargaining position. The main British goal was to defeat France, so until that happened in 1814 the war was primarily defensive. To enlist allies among Native Americans, led by Tecumseh, the British promised an independent Native American state would be created in territory claimed by the United States. British and Canadian forces repeatedly repulsed invasions by US forces, which were inadequately prepared, poorly led, and undermined by the unavailability of militia units, whose commanders refused to place them temporarily under federal control.  Nevertheless, US forces took control of Lake Erie in 1813, and destroyed the offensive abilities of Native American forces, allied to the British, in the Northwest and South. The British invasion of the Chesapeake Bay in 1814 culminated in the "Burning of Washington", but the subsequent British attack on Baltimore was repelled. A British incursion into New York during 1814 was defeated at the Battle of Plattsburgh, and the invasion of Louisiana that launched before word of a ceasefire had reached General Andrew Jackson was decisively defeated at the Battle of New Orleans in 1815. Negotiations began in 1814 and produced the Treaty of Ghent, which restored the status quo ante bellum: there were no territorial gains by either side, and the British strategy of creating an independent Native American state was abandoned after strong American pressure. The United Kingdom retained the theoretical right of impressment, but stopped impressing any sailors, while the United States dropped the issue for good. The US celebrated the outcome as a victorious "second war of independence". The British, having finally defeated Napoleon at the Battle of Waterloo, celebrated that triumph and largely forgot their second war with the US. Tensions between the US and Canada were resolved through diplomacy. The War of 1812 marked the end of a long period of conflict (1775–1815) and ushered in a new era of peace between the two nations.

Disputes 1815–60

The Monroe Doctrine, a unilateral response in 1823 to a British suggestion of a joint declaration, expressed American hostility to further European encroachment in the Western hemisphere. Nevertheless, the United States benefited from the common outlook in British policy and its enforcement by the Royal Navy. In the 1840s several states defaulted on bonds owned by British investors. London bankers avoided state bonds afterwards, but invested heavily in American railroad bonds.

In several episodes the American general Winfield Scott proved a sagacious diplomat by tamping down emotions and reaching acceptable compromises. Scott handled the Caroline affair in 1837. Rebels from British North America (now Ontario) fled to New York and used a small American ship called the Caroline to smuggle supplies into Canada after their rebellion was suppressed. In late 1837, Canadian militia crossed the border into the US and burned the ship, leading to diplomatic protests, a flare-up of Anglophobia, and other incidents.

Tensions on the vague Maine–New Brunswick boundary involved rival teams of lumberjacks in the bloodless Aroostook War of 1839. There was no shooting but both sides tried to uphold national honor and gain a few more miles of timber land. Each side had an old secret map that apparently showed the other side had the better legal case, so compromise was easily reached in the Webster–Ashburton Treaty of 1842, which settled the border in Maine and Minnesota. In 1859, the bloodless Pig War determined the position of the border in relation to the San Juan Islands and Gulf Islands.

British leaders were constantly annoyed from the 1840s to the 1860s by what they saw as Washington's pandering to the democratic mob, as in the Oregon boundary dispute in 1844–46. However British middle-class public opinion sensed a "special relationship" between the two peoples based on language, migration, evangelical Protestantism, liberal traditions, and extensive trade. This constituency rejected war, forcing London to appease the Americans. During the Trent affair of late 1861, London drew the line and Washington retreated.

In 1844-48 the two nations had overlapping claims to Oregon. The area was largely unsettled, making it easy to end the crisis in 1848 by a compromise that split the region evenly, with British Columbia to Great Britain, and Washington, Idaho, and Oregon to America. The US then turned its attention to Mexico, which threatened war over the annexation of Texas. Britain tried without success to moderate the Mexicans, but when the war began it remained neutral. The US gained California, in which the British had shown only passing interest.

Nicaraguan canal

The discovery of gold in California in 1848 brought a heavy demand for passage to the gold fields, with the main routes crossing disease-ridden Panama to avoid a very long slow sailing voyage around all of South America. A railroad was built that carried 600,000 passengers but the disease threat remained. A canal in Nicaragua was a much more healthy and attractive possibility, and American businessmen gained the necessary permissions, along with a US treaty with Nicaragua.  However the British were determined to block an American canal, and seized key locations on the Mosquito Coast on the Atlantic that blocked it.  The Whig Party was in charge in Washington and unlike the bellicose Democrats wanted a businesslike peaceful solution. The United States decided that a canal should be open and neutral to all the world's traffic, and not be militarized. Tensions escalated locally, with small-scale physical confrontations in the field. Washington and London found a diplomatic solution. The Clayton–Bulwer Treaty of 1850 guaranteed equal canal rights to both the US and Britain. Each agreed not to colonize Central America. However, no Nicaragua canal was ever started.

By the late 1890s Britain saw the need for much improved relations with the United States, and agreed to allow the US to build a canal through either Nicaragua or Panama. The choice was Panama.  The Hay–Pauncefote Treaty of 1901 replaced the Clayton–Bulwer Treaty, and adopted the rule of neutralization for the Panama Canal which the US built; it opened in 1914.

American Civil War

In the American Civil War a major Confederate goal was to win recognition from Britain and France, which it expected would lead them to war with the US and enable the Confederacy to win independence. Because of astute American diplomacy, no nation ever recognised the Confederacy and war with Britain was averted. Nevertheless, there was considerable British sentiment in favour of weakening the US by helping the South win. At the beginning of the war Britain issued a proclamation of neutrality. The Confederate States of America had assumed all along that Britain would surely enter the war to protect its vital supply of cotton. This "King Cotton" argument was one reason the Confederates felt confident in the first place about going to war, but the Southerners had never consulted the Europeans and were tardy in sending diplomats. Even before the fighting began in April 1861 Confederate citizens (acting without government authority) cut off cotton shipments in an effort to exert cotton diplomacy. It failed because Britain had warehouses filled with cotton, whose value was soaring; not until 1862 did shortages become acute.

The Trent Affair in late 1861 nearly caused a war. A warship of the US Navy stopped the British civilian vessel RMS Trent and took off two Confederate diplomats, James Murray Mason and John Slidell. Britain prepared for war and demanded their immediate release. President Lincoln released the diplomats and the episode ended quietly.

Britain realised that any recognition of an independent Confederacy would be treated as an act of war against the United States. The British economy was heavily reliant on trade with the United States, most notably cheap grain imports which in the event of war, would be cut off by the Americans. Indeed, the Americans would launch all-out naval war against the entire British merchant fleet.

Despite outrage and intense American protests, London allowed the British-built CSS Alabama to leave port and become a commerce raider under the naval flag of the Confederacy. The war ended in 1865; arbitration settled the issue in 1871, with a payment of $15.5 million in gold for the damages caused.

In January 1863 Lincoln issued the Emancipation Proclamation, which was strongly supported by liberal elements in Britain. The British government predicted that emancipation of the slaves in America would create a race war in the country, and that intervention might be required on humanitarian grounds. This prediction turned out to be unfounded, and the declining capabilities of the Confederacy—such as loss of major ports and rivers—made its likelihood of success smaller and smaller.

Late 19th century

Canada

Relations were chilly during the 1860s as Americans resented British and Canadian roles during the Civil War. Both sides worked to make sure tensions did not escalate toward war. After the war American authorities looked the other way as Irish Catholic "Fenians" plotted and even attempted an tiny invasion of Canada to create pressure for an independent Ireland. Irish American politicians, a growing power in the Democratic Party demanded more independence for Ireland and made anti-British rhetoric—called "twisting the lion's tail"—a staple of election campaign appeals to the Irish vote.

The arbitration of the Alabama Claims in 1872 provided a satisfactory reconciliation; The British paid the United States $15.5 million for the economic damage caused by Confederate Navy warships purchased from it. Canada could never be defended so the British decided to cut their losses and eliminate the risk of a conflict with the US. The first ministry of William Gladstone withdrew from all its historic military and political responsibilities in North America. It brought home its troops (keeping Halifax as an Atlantic naval base), and turned responsibility over to the locals.  That made it wise in 1867 to unify the separate Canadian colonies into a self-governing confederation named the "Dominion of Canada".

Free trade
Britain persisted in its free trade policy even as its major rivals, the US and Germany, turned to high tariffs (as did Canada). American heavy industry grew faster than Britain, and by the 1890s was crowding British machinery and other products out of the world market.  London, however, remained the world's financial center, even as much of its investment was directed toward American railways. The Americans remained far behind the British in international shipping and insurance.

The American economic "invasion" of the British home market demanded a response. British conservatives promoted what they called "tariff reform", which consisted of raising the tariff, especially from countries outside the British Empire. Liberals counterattacked by portraying tariff reform as unpatriotic. Tariffs were finally imposed in the 1930s. Without tariffs to protect them, British businessmen were obliged to lose their market or else rethink and modernise their operations. For example, the boot and shoe industry faced increasing imports of American footwear; Americans took over the market for shoe machinery. British companies realised they had to meet the competition so they re-examined their traditional methods of work, labour utilisation, and industrial relations, and to rethink how to market footwear in terms of the demand for fashion.

Venezuelan and Alaska border disputes

In 1895 a new crisis erupted in South America. A border dispute between British Guiana and Venezuela caused a crisis when Washington spoke out to take Venezuela's side. Propaganda sponsored by Venezuela convinced American public opinion that the British were infringing on Venezuelan territory. Prime Minister Salisbury stood firm. The crisis escalated when President Grover Cleveland, citing the Monroe Doctrine,  issued an ultimatum in late 1895. Salisbury's cabinet convinced him he had to go to arbitration.  Both sides calmed down and the issue was quickly resolved through arbitration which largely upheld the British position on the legal boundary line. Salisbury remained angry but a consensus was reached in London, led by Lord Landsdowne, to seek much friendlier relations with the United States.  By standing with a Latin American nation against the encroachment of the British, the US improved relations with the Latin Americans, and the cordial manner of the procedure improved diplomatic relations with Britain.

The Olney-Pauncefote Treaty of 1897 was a proposed treaty between the US and Britain in 1897 that required arbitration of major disputes.  Despite wide public and elite support, the treaty was rejected by the US Senate, which was jealous of its prerogatives, and never went into effect.

Arbitration was used to settle the dispute over the boundary between Alaska and Canada, but the Canadians felt betrayed by the result. American and Russian diplomats drawing up the treaty for the Alaska Purchase of 1867 drew the boundary between Canada and Alaska in ambiguous fashion. With the gold rush into the Canadian Yukon in 1898, miners had to enter through Alaska. Canada wanted the boundary redrawn to obtain its own seaport. Canada rejected the American offer of a long-term lease on an American port. The issue went to arbitration and the Alaska boundary dispute was finally resolved by an arbitration in 1903. The decision favoured the US when the British judge sided with the three American judges against the two Canadian judges on the arbitration panel. Canadian public opinion was outraged that their interests were sacrificed by London for the benefit of British-American harmony.

The Great Rapprochement

The Great Rapprochement is the convergence of social and political objectives between London and Washington from 1895 until World War I began in 1914. This was despite a large Irish Catholic element in the Democratic Party, which provided a major base for demands for Irish independence, and frequent anti-British rhetoric, especially at election time.

The most notable sign of improving relations during the Great Rapprochement was Britain's actions during the Spanish–American War of 1898. Initially London supported Madrid and its colonial rule over Cuba, since the perceived threat of American occupation and a territorial acquisition of Cuba by the United States might harm British trade and commercial interests within its own possessions in the West Indies. However, after the United States made genuine assurances that it would grant Cuba's independence (which eventually occurred in 1902), the British abandoned this policy and ultimately sided with the United States, unlike most other European powers who supported Spain. In return Washington supported Britain during the Boer War, although many Americans favored the Boers.

Victory in the Spanish–American War had given the United States an imperialistic influence overseas. The US and Britain supported the Open Door Policy in China, blocking the expansion of other empires. Both nations contributed soldiers to the Eight-Nation Alliance which suppressed the Boxer Rebellion in China in 1900.

The naval blockade of several months  (1902-1903) imposed against Venezuela by Britain, Germany and Italy over President Cipriano Castro's refusal to pay foreign debts and damages suffered by European citizens in a recent failed civil war. Castro assumed that the Monroe Doctrine would see the US prevent European military intervention, but at the time President Theodore Roosevelt saw the Doctrine as concerning European seizure of territory, rather than intervention per se. Roosevelt also was concerned with the threat of penetration into the region by Germany and Britain. With Castro failing to back down under US pressure and increasingly negative British and American press reactions to the affair, President Roosevelt persuaded the blockading nations to agree to a compromise, but maintained the blockade during negotiations over the details of refinancing the debt on Washington Protocols. This incident was a major driver of the Roosevelt Corollary and the subsequent US Big Stick policy and Dollar Diplomacy in Latin America.

In 1907–09, President Roosevelt sent the "Great White Fleet" on an international tour, to demonstrate the power projection of the United States' blue-water navy, which had become second only to the Royal Navy in size and firepower.

World War I

The United States had a policy of strict neutrality and was willing to export any product to any country. Germany could not import anything due to the British blockade and British control over exports to neutral countries neighboring Germany. American trade escalated to the Allied Powers, especially in farm products.  British purchases were financed by the sale of American assets owned by the British. When that was exhausted the British borrowed heavily from New York banks. When that credit ran dry in late 1916, a financial crisis was at hand for Britain.

American public opinion moved steadily against Germany, especially in the wake of the Belgian atrocities in 1914 and the sinking of the RMS Lusitania in 1915. The large German American and Irish Catholic element called for staying out of the war, but the German Americans were increasingly marginalised. Berlin renewed unrestricted submarine warfare in 1917 knowing it would lead to war with the US. Germany's invitation to Mexico to join in war against the US in the Zimmermann Telegram was the last straw, and the US declared war in April 1917. The Balfour Mission in April and May tried to promote cooperation between the UK and US. The Americans planned to send money, food and munitions, but it soon became clear that millions of soldiers would be needed to decide the war on the Western Front.

The US sent two million soldiers to Europe under the command of General John J. Pershing, with more on the way as the war ended. Many of the Allied forces were skeptical of the competence of the American Expeditionary Force, which in 1917 was severely lacking in training and experience. By summer 1918, the American doughboys were arriving at 10,000 a day, as the German forces were shrinking because they had run out of manpower.

In December 1918 after victory in the World War, President Wilson told a British official in London: “You must not speak of us who come over here as cousins, still less as brothers; we are neither. Neither must you think of us as Anglo-Saxons, for that term can no longer be rightly applied to the people of the United States....There are only two things which can establish and maintain closer relations between your country and mine: they are community of ideals and of interests." The first summit conference took place in London in late 1918, between Wilson and Prime Minister David Lloyd George. It went poorly, as Wilson distrusted Lloyd George as a schemer, and Lloyd George grumbled that the president was excessively moralistic. The two did work together at the Paris Peace Conference, 1919, as part of the Big Four. They moderated the demands of French Prime Minister Georges Clemenceau to permanently weaken the new Weimar Republic. Lloyd George later quipped that sitting between them was like "being seated between Jesus Christ and Napoleon".

John W. Davis (1873-1955) served as Wilson's ambassador from 1918 to 1921. A Southerner from West Virginia, he reflected deep Southern support for Wilsonianism, based on a reborn patriotism, a distrust of the Republican Party, and a resurgence of Anglophilism. Davis proselytized in London for the League of Nations based on his paternalistic belief that peace depended primarily on Anglo-American friendship and leadership. He was disappointed by Wilson's mismanagement of the treaty ratification and by Republican isolationism and distrust of the League.

Inter-war years

Throughout the 1920s and 1930s, the level of mutual hostility was moderately high. The British diplomatic establishment largely distrusted the United States for a series of reasons. They included British suspicion of America's newfound global power, intentions and reliability. Specific frictions included the American rejection of the League of Nations, the refusal to cancel the war debts owed by Britain to the US treasury, the high American tariff of 1930, and especially Franklin Roosevelt's sudden devastating withdrawal from the 1933 London economic conference,  In both countries, the other side lost popularity. Americans disliked the British Empire, particularly its rule in India. Though Irish independence removed the main source of Anglo-American tensions, the Irish-American community was nevertheless slow to drop its historic antagonism. Roosevelt himself publicly stated his support for the self-determination of colonized countries.

Despite the frictions, London realized the United States was now the strongest power, and made it a cardinal principle of British foreign-policy to "cultivate the closest relations with the United States".  As a result,  Britain decided not to renew its military alliance with Japan, which was becoming a major rival to the United States in the Pacific.

President Warren Harding  sponsored a successful Washington Naval Conference in 1922 that largely ended the naval arms race for a decade. The rise of American naval power in 1916-1918 marked the end of the Royal Navy's superiority, an eclipse acknowledged in the Washington Naval Treaty of 1922, when the United States and Britain agreed to equal tonnage quotas on warships.  By 1932, the 1922 treaty was not renewed and Britain, Japan and the US were again in a naval race.

In 1924 the aristocratic diplomat Esmé Howard returned to Washington as ambassador. Puzzled at first by the provincial background and eccentric style of President Calvin Coolidge, Howard came to like and trust the president, realizing that he was conciliatory and eager to find solutions to mutual problems, such as the Liquor Treaty of 1924 which diminished friction over smuggling. Washington was greatly pleased when Britain ended its alliance with Japan. Both nations were pleased when in 1923 the wartime debt problem was compromised on satisfactory terms. London renegotiated its £978 million debt to the US Treasury by promising regular payments of £34 million for ten years then £40 million for 52 years. The idea was for the US to loan money to Germany, which in turn paid reparations to Britain, which in turn paid off its loans from the US government. In 1931 all German payments ended, and in 1932 Britain suspended its payments to the US, which angered American public opinion. The British debt was finally repaid after 1945.

The League of Nations was established, but Wilson refused to negotiate with Republican supporters of the League. They objected to the provision that allowed the League to force the United States to join in a war declared by the League without the approval of Congress or the president. The Treaty of Versailles was defeated in the Senate. The United States never joined the League, leaving Britain and France to dominate the organization. In any case, it had very little effect on major issues and was replaced in 1946 with a United Nations, Largely designed by Roosevelt and his staff, in which both Britain and the United States had veto power.  Major conferences, especially the Washington Conference of 1922 occurred outside League auspices. The US refused to send official delegates to League committees, instead sending unofficial "observers".

Coolidge was impressed with the success of the Washington Naval Conference of 1921–22, and called the second international conference in 1927 to deal with related naval issues, especially putting limits on the number of warships under 10,000 tons. The conference met in Geneva. It failed because France refused to participate, and most of the delegates were admirals who did not want to limit their fleets. Coolidge listened to his own admirals, but President Hoover did not, and in 1930 did achieve a naval agreement with Britain. A second summit took place between President Herbert Hoover and Prime Minister Ramsay MacDonald in the United States in 1929. Both men were seriously devoted to peace, and the meeting went smoothly in discussions regarding naval arms limitations, and the application of the Kellogg–Briand Pact peace pact of 1928.  One result was the successful London Naval Treaty of 1930, which continued the warship limitations among the major powers first set out in 1922.

During the Great Depression, starting in late 1929, the US was preoccupied with its own internal affairs and economic recovery, espousing an isolationist policy. When the US raised tariffs in 1930, the British retaliated by raising their tariffs against outside countries (such as the US) while giving special trade preferences inside the Commonwealth.  The US demanded these special trade preferences be ended in 1946 in exchange for a large loan.

From 1929 to 1932, the overall world total of all trade plunged by over two-thirds, while trade between the US and Britain shrank from $848 million to $288 million, a decline of two-thirds (66%). Proponents of the high 1930 tariff it never expected this, and support for high tariffs rapidly eroded.

When Britain in 1933 called a worldwide London Economic Conference to help resolve the depression, President Franklin D. Roosevelt stunned the world by suddenly refusing to cooperate, ending Conference usefulness overnight.

Tensions over the Irish question faded with the independence of the Irish Free State in 1922. The American Irish had achieved their goal, and in 1938 their most outstanding spokesmen Joseph P. Kennedy, a Democrat close to Roosevelt, became ambassador to the Court of St. James's. He moved in high London society and his daughter married into the aristocracy. Kennedy supported the Neville Chamberlain policy of appeasement toward Germany, and when the war began he advised Washington that prospects for Britain's survival were bleak.  When Winston Churchill came to power in 1940, Kennedy lost all his influence in London and Washington. Washington analysts paid more attention to the measured optimism of Lieutenant Colonel Bradford G. Chynoweth, the War Department's military attache in London.

World War II

Although many of the American people were sympathetic to Britain during the war with Nazi Germany, there was widespread opposition to American intervention in European affairs. This was reflected in a series of Neutrality Acts ratified by the United States Congress in 1935, 1936, and 1937. However, President Roosevelt's policy of cash-and-carry still allowed Britain and France to order munitions from the United States and carry them home. As ambassador to the United States in 1939–40, Lord Lothian supported Lend-Lease and urged Prime Minister Winston Churchill to work more closely with President Franklin Roosevelt. His success can be attributed to his understanding of American politics and culture, his skills in traditional diplomacy, his role as intermediary between Churchill and Roosevelt, and the efficiency of Britain's wartime propaganda agencies.

Winston Churchill, who had long warned against Nazi Germany and demanded rearmament, became prime minister after his predecessor Neville Chamberlain's policy of appeasement had totally collapsed and Britain was unable to reverse the German invasion of Norway in April 1940. After the fall of France in June 1940, Roosevelt gave Britain and (after June 1941) the Soviet Union all aid short of war. The Destroyers for Bases Agreement which was signed in September 1940, gave the United States a 99-year rent-free lease of numerous land and air bases throughout the British Empire in exchange for the Royal Navy receiving 50 old destroyers from the United States Navy. Beginning in March 1941, the United States enacted Lend-Lease in the form of tanks, fighter airplanes, munitions, bullets, food, and medical supplies. Britain received $31.4 billion out of a total of $50.1 billion sent to the Allies. Roosevelt insisted on avoiding the blunder that Wilson had made in the First World War of setting up the financing as loans that had to be repaid by the recipients. Lend lease aid was freely given, with no payments. Also there were also cash loans were repaid at low rates over a half-century.

Summit meetings became a standard practice starting with August 1941, when Churchill and Roosevelt met on British territory, and announced the Atlantic Charter. It became a fundamental document—All the Allies had to sign it—and it led to the formation of the United Nations. Shortly after the Pearl Harbor attack, Churchill spent several weeks in Washington with the senior staff hammering out wartime strategy with the American counterparts at the Arcadia Conference. They set up the Combined Chiefs of Staff to plot and coordinate strategy and operations. Military cooperation was close and successful.

Technical collaboration was even closer, as the two nations shared secrets and weapons regarding the proximity fuze (fuse) and radar, as well as airplane engines, Nazi codes, and the atomic bomb.

Millions of American servicemen were based in Britain during the war. Americans were paid five times more than comparable British servicemen, which led to a certain amount of friction with British men and intermarriage with British women.

In 1945 Britain sent a portion of the British fleet to assist the planned October invasion of Japan by the United States, but this was cancelled when Japan was forced to surrender unconditionally in August.

India
Serious tension erupted over American demands that India be given independence, a proposition Churchill vehemently rejected. For years Roosevelt had encouraged Britain's disengagement from India. The American position was based on principled opposition to colonialism, practical concern for the outcome of the war, and the expectation of a large American role in a post-colonial era. In 1942 when the Congress Party launched a Quit India movement, the colonial authorities arrested tens of thousands of activists (including Mahatma Gandhi). Meanwhile, India became the main American staging base for aid to China. Churchill threatened to resign if Roosevelt continued to push his demands, and Roosevelt backed down. Churchill was a believer in the integrity of the British Empire, but he was voted out of office in the summer of 1945. Attlee's new Labour government was much more favorable toward Indian aspirations. The process of de-colonization was highlighted by the independence Britain granted to India, Pakistan and Ceylon (now Sri Lanka) in 1947. The United States approved, but provided no financial or diplomatic support.

Postwar financial troubles and The Marshall Plan (1945-1952) 

In the aftermath of the war Britain faced a deep financial crisis, whereas the United States enjoyed an economic boom. The United States continue to finance the British treasury after the war. Much of this aid was designed to restore infrastructure and help refugees. Britain received an emergency loan of $3.75 billion in 1946; it was a 50-year loan with a low 2% interest rate. A more permanent solution was the Marshall Plan of 1948–51, which poured $13 billion into western Europe, of which $3.3 billion went to Britain to help modernise its infrastructure and business practices. The aid was a gift and carried requirements that Britain balance its budget, control tariffs and maintain adequate currency reserves. The American goals for the Marshall plan were to help rebuild the postwar economy in Europe, help modernize the economies, and minimize trade barriers. When the Soviet Union refused to participate or allow its satellites to participate, the Marshall plan became an element of the emerging Cold War. The British Labour government was an enthusiastic participant.

There were political tensions between the two nations regarding Marshall plan requirements. London was dubious about Washington's emphasis on European economic integration as the solution to postwar recovery. Integration with Europe at this point would mean cutting close ties to the emerging Commonwealth. London tried to convince Washington that that American economic aid, especially to the sterling currency area, was necessary to solve the dollar shortage. British economist argued that their position was validated by 1950 as European industrial production exceeded prewar levels. Washington demanded convertibility of sterling currency on July 15, 1947, which produced a severe financial crisis for Britain. Convertibility was suspended on August 20, 1947. However, by 1950, American rearmament and heavy spending on the Korean War and Cold War finally ended the dollar shortage. the balance of payment problems the trouble the postwar government was caused less by economic decline and more by political overreach, according to Jim Tomlinson.

Truman doctrine and emerging Cold War 1947–1953 
The Labour government, which was alarmed at the threat of Communism in the Balkans, implored the US to take over the British role in the Greek Civil War, which led to the Truman Doctrine in 1947, with financial and military aid to Greece and Turkey as Britain withdrew from the region.

The need to form a united front against the Soviet threat compelled the US and Britain to cooperate in helping to form the North Atlantic Treaty Organization with their European allies. NATO is a mutual defence alliance whereby an attack on one member country is deemed an attack on all members.

The United States had an anti-colonial and anti-communist stance in its foreign policy throughout the Cold War. Military forces from the United States and the United Kingdom were heavily involved in the Korean War, fighting under a United Nations mandate.  A military stalemate finally led to an armistice that ended the fighting in 1953. During the same year British and American intelligence agencies worked together and were instrumental in supporting the 1953 Iranian coup d'état were by the Iranian military restored the Shah to power.

In 1954 the US attempted to help the beleaguered French Army at the height of the Battle of Dien Bien Phu in Vietnam. They planned Operation Vulture; a planned aerial assault on the opposing communist Viet Minh siege positions. President Dwight D. Eisenhower made American participation reliant on British support, but Foreign Secretary Sir Anthony Eden was opposed and Vulture was reluctantly cancelled. With the fall of Dien Bien Phu the US Secretary of State John Foster Dulles fell out with Eden. He left the 1954 Geneva Conference, leaving the US to avoid direct association with the negotiations that led to the creation of the Democratic Republic of Vietnam.

Angry denial: the Suez Crisis of 1956 
The Suez Crisis erupted in October 1956 after Britain, France and Israel invaded Egypt to regain control of the Suez Canal. Eisenhower had repeatedly warned London against any such action, and feared a collapse of Western influence in the region. Furthermore, there was risk of a wider war, after the Soviet Union threatened to intervene on the Egyptian side and did invade Hungary to suppress a revolt.  Washington responded with heavy financial and diplomatic pressure to force the invaders to withdraw. British post-war debt was so large that economic sanctions could have caused a devaluation of sterling. This would be a disaster and when it became clear that the international sanctions were serious, the invaders withdrew. Anthony Eden soon resigned as prime minister, leaving office with a ruined reputation. The world noted Britain's fall from status in the Middle East and worldwide. Anglo-American cooperation fell to the lowest point since the 1890s.

However, the new prime minister Harold Macmillan (1957–1963) restored good terms with Eisenhower and President John F. Kennedy (1961–1963). Intimacy and warmth characterized his relationship with the latter who appointed David K. E. Bruce as ambassador.

Lyndon Johnson and Harold Wilson: 1963–1969 

After Kennedy's assassination President Lyndon B. Johnson (1963–1969) kept ambassador Bruce but ignored all his recommendations. Bruce sought closer ties with Britain and greater European unity. Bruce's reports regarding Britain's financial condition were pessimistic and alarmist. With regard to Vietnam, Bruce privately questioned US involvement and constantly urged the Johnson administration to allow Britain more of a role in bringing the conflict to an end. The British ambassador was Sir Patrick Dean (1965-1969).  Dean was preoccupied with sharp difficulties over Vietnam and British military commitments east of Suez. He promoted mutual understanding but was largely ignored by Johnson because the traditional Anglo-American relationship was decaying and Johnson disliked diplomats. London, furthermore, relied less and less on ambassadors and embassies.

Through the US-UK Mutual Defence Agreement signed in 1958, the UK and US resumed military technological cooperation on nuclear weapons, which had been prevented by the 1946 US Atomic Energy Act of 1946 (otherwise known as the Mcmahon Act). Britain's independent nuclear programme was increasingly hampered by funding issues, and the cancellation of the British Blue Streak ballistic missile in 1960 necessitated the purchase of the US Skybolt system. In April 1963, the Polaris Sales Agreement established a basis for the sale of the US UGM-27 Polaris ballistic missile for use in the Royal Navy's submarine fleet starting in 1968.

The American containment policy called for military resistance to the expansion of communism, and the Vietnam War became the main battlefield in the 1950s down to the communist victory in 1975. Prime Minister Harold Wilson (1964-1970) believed in a strong "Special Relationship" and wanted to highlight his dealings with the White House to strengthen his own prestige as a statesman. President Lyndon B. Johnson disliked Wilson, and ignored any  "special" relationship. He agreed to provide financial help but he strongly opposed British plans to devalue the pound and withdraw military units east of Suez.   As the American military involvement deepened after 1964, Johnson repeatedly asked for British ground units to validate international support for American intervention. Wilson never sent troops, but British intelligence, training in jungle warfare, and verbal support was provided.  He also took the initiative in attempting numerous mediation schemes, typically involving Russian intervention, none of which gained traction.  Wilson's policy divided the Labour Party; the Conservative opposition generally supported the American position on Vietnam. Issues of foreign policy were rarely salient in general elections.  Wilson and Johnson also differed sharply on British economic weakness and its declining status as a world power. Historian Jonathan Colman concludes it made for the most unsatisfactory "special" relationship in the 20th century.

The tone of the relationship was set early on when Johnson sent Secretary of State Dean Rusk as head of the American delegation to the state funeral of Winston Churchill in January 1965, rather than the new vice president, Hubert Humphrey. Johnson himself had been hospitalized with influenza and advised by his doctors against attending the funeral. This perceived slight generated much criticism against the president, both in the UK and in the US. Johnson said during a press conference that not sending Humphrey was a "mistake."

1970s
Edward Heath (Prime minister 1970–74) and Richard Nixon (President 1969–74) maintained a close working relationship. Heath deviated from his predecessors by supporting Nixon's decision to bomb Hanoi and Haiphong in Vietnam in April 1972. Nevertheless, relations deteriorated noticeably during the early 1970s. Throughout his premiership, Heath insisted on using the phrase "natural relationship" instead of "special relationship" to refer to Anglo-American relations, acknowledging the historical and cultural similarities but carefully denying anything special beyond that. Heath was determined to restore a measure of equality to Anglo-American relations which the United States had increasingly dominated as the power and economy of the United Kingdom flagged in the post-colonial era.

Heath's renewed push for British admittance to the European Economic Community (EEC) brought new tensions between the United Kingdom and the United States. French President Charles De Gaulle, who believed that British entry would allow undue American influence on the organisation, had vetoed previous British attempts at entry. Heath's final bid benefited from the more moderate views of Georges Pompidou, De Gaulle's successor as President of France, and his own Eurocentric foreign policy schedule. The Nixon administration viewed this bid as a pivot away from close ties with the United States in favour of continental Europe. After Britain's admission to the EEC in 1973, Heath confirmed this interpretation by notifying his American counterparts that the United Kingdom would henceforth be formulating European policies with other EEC members before discussing them with the United States. Furthermore, Heath indicated his potential willingness to consider a nuclear partnership with France and questioned what the United Kingdom got in return for American use of British military and intelligence facilities worldwide. In return, Nixon and his Secretary of State Henry Kissinger briefly cut off the Anglo-American intelligence tap in August 1973. Kissinger then attempted to restore American influence in Europe with his abortive 1973 "Year of Europe" policy plan to update the NATO agreements. Members of the Heath administration, including Heath himself in later years, regarded this announcement with derision.

In 1973, American and British officials disagreed in their handling of the Arab-Israeli Yom Kippur War. While the Nixon administration immediately increased military aid to Israel, Heath maintained British neutrality in the conflict and imposed a British arms embargo on all combatants, which mostly hindered the Israelis by preventing them obtaining spares for their Centurion tanks. Anglo-American disagreement intensified over Nixon's unilateral decision to elevate American forces, stationed at British bases, to DEFCON 3 status on October 25 in response to the breakdown of the United Nations ceasefire. Heath disallowed American intelligence gathering, resupplying, or refueling from British bases in Cyprus, which greatly limited the effective range of American reconnaissance planes. In return, Kissinger imposed a second intelligence cutoff over this disagreement and some in the administration even suggested that the United States should refuse to assist in the British missile upgrade to the Polaris system. Tensions between the United States and United Kingdom relaxed as the second ceasefire took effect. Wilson's return to power in 1974 helped to return Anglo-American relations to normality.

On July 23, 1977, officials from the United Kingdom and the United States renegotiated the previous Bermuda I Agreement, and signed the Bermuda II Agreement under which only four airlines, two from the United Kingdom and two from the United States, were allowed to operate flights between London Heathrow Airport and specified "gateway cities" in the United States. The Bermuda II Agreement was in effect for nearly 30 years until it was eventually replaced by the EU-US Open Skies Agreement, which was signed on April 30, 2007, and entered into effect on March 30, 2008.

1980s

Margaret Thatcher (Prime Minister, 1979–1990) and Ronald Reagan (President, 1981–1989) bonded quickly. According to David Cannadine:
 In many ways they were very different figures: he was sunny, genial, charming, relaxed, upbeat, and with little intellectual curiosity or command of policy detail; she was domineering, belligerent, confrontational, tireless, hyperactive, and with an unrivalled command of facts and figures. But the chemistry between them worked. Reagan had been grateful for her interest in him at a time when the British establishment refused to take him seriously; she agreed with him about the importance of creating wealth, cutting taxes, and building up stronger defences against Soviet Russia; and both believed in liberty and free-market freedom, and in the need to outface what Reagan would later call 'the evil empire'.

Throughout the 1980s, Thatcher was strongly supportive of Reagan's unwavering stance towards the Soviet Union. Often described as "political soulmates" and a high point in the "Special Relationship", Reagan and Thatcher met many times throughout their political careers, speaking in concert when confronting Soviet general secretary Mikhail Gorbachev. During the Soviet–Afghan War, Britain was covertly involved and helped support the US military and financial aid to the anti communist mujaheddin insurgents in Operation Cyclone.

In 1982, the British Government made a request to the United States, which the Americans agreed upon in principle, to sell the Trident II D5 ballistic missile, associated equipment, and related system support for use on four  nuclear submarines in the Royal Navy. The Trident II D5 ballistic missile replaced the United Kingdom's previous use of the UGM-27 Polaris ballistic missile, beginning in the mid-1990s.

In the Falklands War in 1982, the United States initially tried to mediate between the United Kingdom and Argentina, but ended up supporting the United Kingdom's counter-invasion. The US supplied the British Armed Forces with equipment as well as logistical support.

In October 1983, the United States and an Organisation of Eastern Caribbean States coalition undertook Operation Urgent Fury, the invasion of the Commonwealth island nation of Grenada following a Marxist coup. Neighboring countries in the region asked the United States to intervene militarily, which it did successfully despite having made assurances to a deeply resentful British Government.

On April 15, 1986, the US military under President Reagan launched Operation El Dorado Canyon, a bombing of Tripoli and Benghazi in Libya, from Royal Air Force stations in England with the permission of Prime Minister Thatcher. It was a counter-attack by the United States in response to Libyan state-sponsored terrorism directed towards civilians and American servicemen under Muammar Gaddafi, especially the 1986 West Berlin discotheque bombing.

On December 21, 1988, Pan American Worldways' Flight 103 from London Heathrow Airport to New York's John F. Kennedy International Airport exploded over the town of Lockerbie, Scotland, killing 189 Americans and 40 Britons on board. The motive that is generally attributed to Libya can be traced back to a series of military confrontations with the United States Navy in the 1980s in the Gulf of Sidra, the whole of which Libya claimed as its territorial waters. Despite a guilty verdict on January 31, 2001, by the Scottish High Court of Justiciary which ruled against Abdelbaset al-Megrahi, the bomber, on charges of murder and conspiracy to commit murder, Libya never formally admitted carrying out the 1988 bombing over Scotland until 2003.

During the Soviet–Afghan War, the United States and the United Kingdom throughout the 1980s provided arms to the Mujahideen rebels in Afghanistan until the last troops from the Soviet Union left Afghanistan in February 1989.

Post-Cold War

When the United States became the world's lone superpower after the dissolution of the Soviet Union, new threats emerged which confronted the United States and its NATO allies. With military build-up beginning in August 1990 and the use of force beginning in January 1991, the United States, followed at a distance by Britain, provided the two largest forces respectively for the coalition army which liberated Kuwait from Saddam Hussein's regime during the Persian Gulf War.

In the 1997 general election, the British Labour Party was elected to office for the first time in eighteen years. The new prime minister, Tony Blair, and Bill Clinton both used the expression "Third Way" to describe their centre-left ideologies. In August 1997, the American people expressed solidarity with the British people, sharing in their grief and sense of shock on the death of Diana, Princess of Wales, who perished in a car crash in Paris. Throughout 1998 and 1999, the United States and Britain sent troops to impose peace during the Kosovo War. Tony Blair made it a point to develop very close relationships with the White House.

War on Terror and Iraq War

67 Britons were among the 2,977 victims killed during the terrorist attacks on the World Trade Center and elsewhere on September 11, 2001. Al-Qaeda was the attacker. Following the attacks, there was an enormous outpouring of sympathy from the United Kingdom for the American people, and Blair was one of Bush's strongest international supporters for military action against Al-Qaeda and the Taliban. Indeed, Blair became the most articulate spokesman. President Bush told Congress that "America has no truer friend than Great Britain".

The United States declared a War on Terror following the attacks. British forces participated in NATO's war in Afghanistan. Blair took the lead (against the opposition of France, Canada, Germany, China, and Russia) in advocating the invasion of Iraq in 2003. Again Britain was second only to the US in sending forces to Iraq. Both sides wound down after 2009, and withdrew their last troops in 2011. President Bush and Prime Minister Blair provided sustained mutual political and diplomatic support and won votes in Congress and parliament against their critics at home.  During this period Secretary of Defense Donald Rumsfeld said that "America has no finer ally than the United Kingdom."

The 7 July 2005 London bombings emphasised the difference in the nature of the terrorist threat to both nations. The United States concentrated primarily on global enemies, like the al-Qaeda network and other Islamic extremists from the Middle East. The London bombings were carried out by homegrown extremist Muslims, and it emphasised the United Kingdom's threat from the radicalisation of its own people.

After claims by Liberty that British airports had been used by the CIA for extraordinary rendition flights, the Association of Chief Police Officers launched an investigation in November 2005. The report was published in June 2007 and found no evidence to support the claim. This was on the same day the Council of Europe released its report with evidence that the UK had colluded in extraordinary rendition, thus directly contradicting ACPO's findings. A 2018 report by the Intelligence and Security Committee of Parliament found the United Kingdom, specifically the MI5 and MI6, to be complicit in many of the renditions done by the US, having helped fund them, supplying them with intelligence and knowingly allowing them to happen.

By 2007, support amongst the British public for the Iraq war had plummeted. Despite Tony Blair's historically low approval ratings with the British people, mainly due to allegations of faulty government intelligence of Iraq possessing weapons of mass destruction, his unapologetic and unwavering stance for the British alliance with the United States can be summed up in his own words. He said, "We should remain the closest ally of the US ... not because they are powerful, but because we share their values." The alliance between George W. Bush and Tony Blair seriously damaged the prime minister's standing in the eyes of many British citizens. Tony Blair argued it was in the United Kingdom's interest to "protect and strengthen the bond" with the United States regardless of who is in the White House. A perception that the relationship was unequal led to use of the term "Poodle-ism" in the British media, that Britain and its leaders were lapdogs to the Americans.

On June 11, 2009, the British Overseas Territory of Bermuda accepted four Chinese Uighurs from the American detainment facility at the Guantanamo Bay Naval Base in Cuba. All had been captured by during the United States-led invasion of Afghanistan in October 2001. This decision angered London, as British officials felt they should have been consulted.

Tension with Scotland 

On August 20, 2009, The Scottish Government headed by First Minister Alex Salmond announced that it would release Abdelbaset al-Megrahi on medical grounds. He was the only person convicted in the terrorist plot which killed 190 Americans and 43 Britons on Pan American Worldways' Flight 103 over the town of Lockerbie, Scotland on December 21, 1988. He was sentenced to life in prison in 2001, but was now released after being diagnosed with terminal cancer, with around three months to live. Americans said the decision was uncompassionate and insensitive to the memory of the victims of the 1988 Lockerbie bombing. President Barack Obama said that the decision was "highly objectionable". US Ambassador Louis Susman said that although the decision made by Scotland was extremely regrettable, relations with the United Kingdom would remain fully intact and strong. The British government led by Gordon Brown was not involved in the release and Prime Minister Brown stated at a press conference his government had played 'no role' in the Scottish decision. Abdelbaset al-Megrahi died May 20, 2012, at the age of 60.

Present status

British policy is that the relationship with the United States represents the United Kingdom's "most important bilateral relationship" in the world. United States Secretary of State Hillary Clinton paid tribute to the relationship in February 2009 by saying, "it stands the test of time".

John Dumbrell argued in 2006:

Obama administration 2009–2017
On March 3, 2009, Gordon Brown made his first visit to the Obama White House. During his visit, he presented the president a gift in the form of a pen holder carved from HMS Gannet, which served anti-slavery missions off the coast of Africa. Barack Obama's gift to the prime minister was a box of 25 DVDs with movies including Star Wars and E.T. The wife of the prime minister, Sarah Brown, gave the Obama daughters, Sasha and Malia, two dresses from British clothing retailer Topshop, and a few unpublished books that have not reached the United States. Michelle Obama gave the prime minister's sons two Marine One helicopter toys. During this visit to the United States, Gordon Brown made an address to a joint session of the United States Congress, a privilege rarely accorded to foreign heads of government.

In March 2009, a Gallup poll of Americans showed 36% identified Britain as their country's "most valuable ally", followed by Canada, Japan, Israel, and Germany rounding out the top five. The poll also indicated that 89% of Americans view the United Kingdom favourably, second only to Canada with 90%. According to the Pew Research Center, a global survey conducted in July 2009 revealed that 70% of Britons who responded had a favourable view of the United States.

In 2010, Obama stated "the United States has no closer friend and ally than the United Kingdom, and I reiterated my deep and personal commitment to the special relationship between our two countries."

In February 2011, The Daily Telegraph, based on evidence from WikiLeaks, reported that the United States had tendered sensitive information about the British Trident nuclear arsenal (whose missile delivery systems are manufactured and maintained in the United States) to the Russian Federation as part of a deal to encourage Russia to ratify the New START Treaty. Professor Malcolm Chalmers of the Royal United Services Institute for Defence and Security Studies speculated that serial numbers could undermine Britain's non-verification policy by providing Russia "with another data point to gauge the size of the British arsenal".

On May 25, 2011, during his official visit to the UK, Obama reaffirmed the relationship between the United Kingdom and the United States of America in an address to Parliament at Westminster Hall. Amongst other points, Obama stated: "I've come here today to reaffirm one of the oldest; one of the strongest alliances the World has ever known. It's long been said that the United States and the United Kingdom share a special relationship."

In the final days before the Scottish independence referendum in September 2014, Obama announced in public the vested interest of the United States of America in enjoying the continued partnership with a 'strong and united' UK which he described as "one of the closest allies we will ever have".

During a joint press conference with Prime Minister Theresa May, Obama stated "The bottom line is, is that we don't have a stronger partner anywhere in the world than the United Kingdom."

Trump administration 2017–2021

President Donald Trump and British Prime Minister Theresa May aimed to continue the United Kingdom–United States special relationship. May was the first foreign leader Trump hosted in Washington after taking office and UKIP leader Nigel Farage was the first foreign politician Trump met with after winning the presidential election, when he was still President-elect. However, Trump was the subject of popular protests in Britain even before he took office, particularly because of his anti-immigration proposals, misogyny and racism. During his presidency there were protests when he was inaugurated, when he announced his first immigration ban on citizens from certain Muslim countries, and when he said he would recognize Jerusalem as the capital of Israel.

On June 4, 2017, Trump responded to a terror attack on London Bridge by attacking London Mayor Sadiq Khan for saying that there "was no reason to be alarmed". The comments were condemned by Khan who stated that his remarks were deliberately taken out of context in that he was referring to an increased police presence in the days after the attack, which should not alarm the public. Trump also suggested that, "we must stop being politically correct and get down to the business of security for our people".

On November 29, 2017, Trump re-tweeted three videos posted by Jayda Fransen, deputy leader of the far-right nationalist Britain First party. One of the videos, titled 'Muslim immigrant beats up Dutch boy on crutches', was subsequently discredited by the Dutch embassy in the United States. The spokesperson for the Prime Minister said that what the President had done was 'wrong' and Foreign Secretary Boris Johnson said that 'hate speech had no place in the UK'. In response, Trump tweeted at the Prime Minister suggesting that she worry about immigration in her own country rather than whom he chose to retweet. White House spokeswoman Sarah Sanders said that the President attempted to start a conversation about immigration.

May was the first foreign leader to visit Trump after his inauguration, and she invited him to make a return visit. More than 1.8 million UK citizens signed a petition to rescind the invitation, and Parliament debated a nonbinding resolution to that effect in February 2017. The visit was tentatively planned for late February 2018, and would include a ceremonial opening of the new American embassy in Nine Elms. It was speculated that the real reason for cancelling the visit was due to Trump's unpopularity and the possibility of large protests against him in London.

Trump made a second visit in June 2019, this time as guests of the Queen and to hold talks with May. Thousands protested his visit, just like they did when he made his first trip.

On July 7, 2019, secret diplomatic cables from Ambassador Kim Darroch to the British government, dating from 2017 to 2019, were leaked to The Mail on Sunday. They included Darroch's unflattering assessments of the Trump administration, e.g. that it was "inept and insecure". In response, Nigel Farage said Darroch was "totally unsuitable" for office, and Trump tweeted that Darroch was "not liked or well thought of within the US" and that "we will no longer deal with him". The Prime Minister, Theresa May, expressed support for Darroch and ordered a leak inquiry.  On July 10, Darroch resigned as Ambassador to the United States. He wrote that "the current situation is making it impossible for me to carry out my role as I would like". Previously, Boris Johnson, the frontrunner in the election to replace May, had declined to publicly back Darroch. Consensus among political commentators in the UK was that this made Darroch's position untenable. May and the leader of the opposition, Jeremy Corbyn, praised Darroch's service in the House of Commons and deplored that he had to resign under pressure from the US.

Controversy over American foods 
In 2017 Trump appointed pharmaceutical heir Woody Johnson, a financial supporter of his campaign, as ambassador 2017–2021. Johnson advocated for more agricultural trade and the deregulation of US food exports to Britain. In March 2019, Johnson wrote an article in the Daily Telegraph promoting American chlorinated chicken as safe, and stating that health fears over hormone-fed beef were "myths". This came after he urged the UK to open up to the US agriculture market after the British exit from the European Union and ignore the "smear campaign" of those with "their own protectionist agenda".  Johnson was criticised by several British agriculture standard boards, such as the Red Tractor Assurance whose CEO, Jim Moseley stated the UK's food standards were "now under threat from ... the United States food lobby". Minette Batters, president of the UK National Farmers Union, agreed with Johnson's claims that chlorine-rinsed chicken was safe for consumption, but stated that factors such as animal welfare and environmental protection also had to be considered. George Eustace, former British agriculture minister told the press:Agriculture in the US remains quite backward in many respects....Whereas we have a 'farm to fork' approach to managing disease and contamination risk throughout the supply chain through good husbandry, the US is more inclined to simply treat contamination of its meat at the end with a chlorine or similar wash.

Blocking Chinese technology

In 2020 while the UK was planning to invest in new 5G mobile telecommunications equipment, Washington was openly lobbying and pressuring the British government, to prevent allowing the Chinese telecommunications giant Huawei from installing its equipment in the UK. This was over allegations it will allow the Chinese to espionage in the country, and this might be a break in the Five Eyes intelligence programme. Already since 2003 the UK did allow its telecoms operators such as the incumbent BT to install Huawei equipment in its infrastructure backbone. To prevent any concerns about possible hacking after reports of unusual activity in the Huawei equipment, in 2010 Huawei jointly created with the British intelligence agency GCHQ an equipment investigate centre in the outskirts of Banbury called the Huawei Cyber Security Evaluation Centre which is also known by its nickname "the Cell". In July 2020 after American pressure, the British government announced that it has banned adding any new Huawei telecoms equipment into the British landline and mobile networks, and request that all companies replace the existing equipment by 2027.

Biden administration 2021–present 

Biden's first overseas trip and first face-to-face meeting with a British Prime Minister was at the 2021 G7 Summit, hosted in Cornwall, England in June. Johnson stated "there's so much that [the US] want to do together" with us. The first meeting between the two leaders included plans to re-establish travel links between the US and UK, which had been banned by the US since the start of the pandemic and to agree a deal (the New Atlantic Charter), which commits the countries to working together on "the key challenges of this century - cyber security, emerging technologies, global health and climate change". President Biden explicitly "affirmed the special relationship". The revitalized Atlantic Charter would build "on the commitments and aspirations set out eighty years ago" and also "reaffirm" the "commitment to work together to realise our vision for a more peaceful and prosperous future."

The chaotic withdrawal from Afghanistan and fall of Kabul in August 2021 had a negative impact on United Kingdom–United States relations, with the British government briefing media against the American government.

AUKUS

On September 15, 2021, the leaders of the US, the UK and Australia announced "AUKUS":a new security partnership in the Indo-Pacific, building on the longstanding alliance between the three to share intelligence, deepen cooperation and help Australia build a new nuclear-powered submarine to counter China.

Rejection of new trade agreement
On September 21, 2021, Boris Johnson stated that he would not commit to a new trade agreement by 2024, stating that President Biden has "a lot of fish to fry."

Trade, investment and the economy 
The United States accounts for the United Kingdom's largest single export market, buying $57 billion worth of British goods in 2007. Total trade of imports and exports between the United Kingdom and the United States amounted to the sum of $107.2 billion in 2007.

The United States and the United Kingdom share the world's largest foreign direct investment partnership. In 2005, American direct investment in the United Kingdom totaled $324 billion while British direct investment in the United States totaled $282 billion.

In a press conference that made several references to the special relationship, US Secretary of State John Kerry, in London with UK Foreign Secretary William Hague on September 9, 2013, said:

We are not only each other's largest investors in each of our countries, one to the other, but the fact is that every day almost one million people go to work in America for British companies that are in the United States, just as more than one million people go to work here in Great Britain for American companies that are here. So we are enormously tied together, obviously. And we are committed to making both the U.S.-UK and the U.S.-EU relationships even stronger drivers of our prosperity.

Tourism
More than 4.5 million Britons visit the United States every year, spending $14 billion. Around 3 million people from the United States visit the United Kingdom every year, spending $10 billion. With the worldwide pandemic of COVID-19, international tourism in both countries collapsed in 2020.

Transportation
All three major American airlines, American Airlines, United Airlines and Delta Airlines fly directly between the US and the UK, principally between London and New York, although all three fly to Heathrow Airport from a number of hubs, as well as to other major UK airports such as Manchester Airport, Edinburgh Airport and Glasgow Airport. Additionally, Delta codeshares with the UK's Virgin Atlantic which it owns a 49% stake in. Low-cost carriers JetBlue and Southwest Airlines fly between the eastern US and the British overseas territories of Bermuda, British Virgin Islands, Cayman Islands and the Turks & Caicos Islands, with JetBlue also flying between London and New York.  The British flag carrier British Airways flies to over twenty destinations in the US. Also the main British charter airline, TUI Airways fly to the US although principally to the holiday destinations of Florida and California.

Both American Airlines and BA are founders of the airline alliance, Oneworld. BA, TUI Airways and Virgin Atlantic are major purchasers of American-made Boeing aircraft. Flying between the US and UK is at the moment in 2019 supported by the US-EU Open Skies Agreement which came about in 2008, which allows any airline from both countries to fly between each other.

New York's John F. Kennedy International Airport is the most popular international destination for people flying out of Heathrow Airport. Approximately 2,802,870 people on multiple daily non-stop flights flew from Heathrow to JFK in 2008. Concorde, British Airways flagship supersonic airliner, began trans-Atlantic service to Washington Dulles International Airport in the United States on May 24, 1976. The trans-Atlantic route between London's Heathrow and New York's JFK in under 3½ hours, had its first operational flight between the two hubs on October 19, 1977, and the last being on October 23, 2003.

The two main American intercity bus carriers; Greyhound Lines and during the period from 1999 to 2019 Coach USA, plus their subsidiaries are each owned by a major British transportation company FirstGroup with Greyhound and Stagecoach with Coach USA. Coach USA's budget brand Megabus which started in 2006, itself is a copycat of the British version of the discount coach company that started in 2003.

In 2022, Britain announced that it would cease flights to the US over the problems with 5G network towers. It appears that the towers can interfere with the aircraft systems.

State and official visits

In the 20th century, there were 78 formal and informal summits bringing together the president and the prime minister to deal with an agreed-upon agenda. The first was 1918, the second in 1929. The rest began in 1941, which marked the decline of ambassadors as the key transmitters of policy discussions. In three out of four of the summits, the British delegation traveled to America. Summits have become much less important in the 21st century, with its new communication modes.

State visits involving the head of state have been made over the years by four presidents and two monarchs. Queen Elizabeth II has met all the presidents since Truman except Johnson (Queen Elizabeth II would have met Johnson had he not been hospitalized with the influenza when Churchill died; he very much wanted to attend the funeral and had arranged to meet her privately after the funeral.). In addition, the Queen made three private visits in 1984, 1985, and 1991 to see stallion stations and stud farms.

Diplomacy

Of United States
 London (Embassy)
 Edinburgh (Consulate General)
 Belfast (Consulate General)
 Hamilton, Bermuda (Consulate General)
 George Town, Cayman Islands (Consular agent attached to embassy in Kingston, Jamaica)
 Providenciales, Turks and Caicos Islands (Consulate office attached to embassy in Nassau, Bahamas)

Of United Kingdom
 Washington, D.C. (Embassy)
 Atlanta (Consulate-General)
 Boston (Consulate-General)
 Chicago (Consulate-General)
 Houston (Consulate-General)
 Los Angeles (Consulate-General)
 Miami (Consulate-General)
 New York City (Consulate-General)
 San Francisco (Consulate-General)

Common memberships

 Bank for International Settlements
 British-American Project
 Food and Agriculture Organization
 Group of Eight
 Group of Ten
 Group of Twenty Finance Ministers and Central Bank Governors
 International Atomic Energy Agency
 International Chamber of Commerce
 International Court of Justice
 International Electrotechnical Commission
 International Energy Agency
 International Monetary Fund
 International Olympic Committee
 International Renewable Energy Agency
 International Telecommunication Union

 Interpol
 North Atlantic Treaty Organization
 Nuclear Non-Proliferation Treaty
 Organisation for Economic Co-operation and Development
 Organization for Security and Co-operation in Europe
 Pilgrims Society
 Rim of the Pacific Exercise
 UKUSA Community
 United Nations
 United Nations Educational, Scientific and Cultural Organization
 United Nations Security Council
 Universal Postal Union
 World Bank
 World Health Organization
 World Trade Organization

Strategic Alliance Cyber Crime Working Group

The Strategic Alliance Cyber Crime Working Group is an initiative by Australia, Canada, New Zealand, the United Kingdom and headed by the United States as a "formal partnership between these nations dedicated to tackling larger global crime issues, particularly organised crime". The cooperation consists of "five countries from three continents banding together to fight cyber crime in a synergistic way by sharing intelligence, swapping tools and best practices, and strengthening and even synchronising their respective laws".

Within this initiative, there is increased information sharing between the United Kingdom's National Crime Agency and the United States' Federal Bureau of Investigation on matters relating to serious fraud or cyber crime.

UK–USA Security Agreement

The UK–USA Security Agreement is an alliance of five English-speaking countries; Australia, Canada, New Zealand, the United Kingdom, and the United States, for the sole purpose of sharing intelligence. The precursor to this agreement is essentially an extension of the historic BRUSA Agreement which was signed in 1943. In association with the ECHELON system, all five nations are assigned to intelligence collection and analysis from different parts of the world. For example, the United Kingdom hunts for communications in Europe, Africa, and European Russia whereas the United States has responsibility for gathering intelligence in Latin America, Asia, Asiatic Russia, and northern mainland China.

Sister-twinning cities

England and the United States

  Ashby-de-la-Zouch and  Evans, Colorado
  Ashford and  Hopewell, Virginia
  Barnet, London and  Barnet, Vermont
  Barnet, London and  Montclair, New Jersey
  Barnstaple and  Barnstable, Massachusetts
  Belper and  Pawtucket, Rhode Island
  Berwick-upon-Tweed and  Berwick, Pennsylvania
  Billericay and  Billerica, Massachusetts
  Billericay and  Fishers, Indiana
  Birmingham and  Chicago, Illinois
  Bodmin and  Grass Valley, California
  Boston, Lincolnshire and  Boston, Massachusetts
  Brentwood and  Brentwood, Tennessee
  Burton upon Trent and  Elkhart, Indiana
  Bury and  Woodbury, New Jersey
  Calne and  Caln Township, Pennsylvania
  Canterbury and  Bloomington, Illinois
  Cheltenham and  Cheltenham, Pennsylvania
  Chester and  Lakewood, Colorado
  Cleveland, England, UK and  Cleveland, Ohio
  Cornwall and  Cornwall, New York
  County Durham and  Durham County, North Carolina
  Coventry and  Coventry, Connecticut
  Coventry and  Coventry, New York
  Coventry and  Coventry, Rhode Island
  Dalton-in-Furness and  Dalton, Pennsylvania
  Doncaster and  Wilmington, North Carolina
  Dover and  Huber Heights, Ohio
  Durham and  Durham, North Carolina
  Evesham and  Evesham Township, New Jersey
  Fleetwood and  Fleetwood, Pennsylvania
  Gravesend and  Chesterfield, Virginia
  Hartlepool and  Muskegon, Michigan
  Haverhill and  Haverhill, Massachusetts
  Haworth and  Haworth, New Jersey
  Hertford and  Hartford, Connecticut
  Hinckley and  Midland, Ohio
  Keighley and  Myrtle Beach, South Carolina
  Kettering and  Kettering, Ohio
  Kingston upon Hull and  Raleigh, North Carolina
  Leeds, City of and  Louisville, Kentucky
  Lincoln and   Lincoln, Nebraska
  Lambeth, London and  Brooklyn, New York
  London and  New York City, New York
  Manchester and  Los Angeles, California
  Mansfield and  Mansfield, Massachusetts
  Mansfield and  Mansfield, Ohio
  Middlesbrough and  Middlesborough, Kentucky
  Newcastle upon Tyne and  Atlanta, Georgia
  Newmarket and  Lexington, Kentucky
  Norfolk and  Norfolk, Virginia
  Northampton and  Easton, Pennsylvania
  Northampton and  Northampton, Pennsylvania
  Oakham and  Dodgeville, Wisconsin
  Oxford and  Oxford, Michigan
  Penzance and  Nevada City, California
  Plymouth and  Plymouth, Massachusetts
  Portsmouth and  Portsmouth, New Hampshire
  Reading and  Reading, Pennsylvania
  Redruth and  Mineral Point, Wisconsin
  Richmond, London and  Richmond, Virginia
  Rochester and  Rochester, New York
  Rugeley and  Western Springs, Illinois
  Runnymede and  Herndon, Virginia
  Rye and  Rye, New Hampshire
  Salisbury and  Salisbury, Maryland
  Salisbury and  Salisbury, North Carolina
  Sefton, Metropolitan Borough of and  Fort Lauderdale, Florida
  Sheffield and  Pittsburgh, Pennsylvania
  Shrewsbury and  Shrewsbury, Massachusetts
  Southampton and  Hampton, Virginia
  Stafford and  Stafford County, Virginia
  Swindon and  Chattanooga, Tennessee
  Southwark, London and  Cambridge, Massachusetts
  Stourbridge and  Sturbridge, Massachusetts
  Stratford-upon-Avon and  Stratford, Connecticut
  Stroud and  Stroud, Oklahoma
  Sunderland and  Washington, D.C.
  Taunton and  Taunton, Massachusetts
  Truro and  Truro, Massachusetts
  Warrington and  Lake County, Illinois
  Warwick and  Warwick, New York
  Warwick and  Warwick, Rhode Island
  Watford and  Wilmington, Delaware
  Whitby and  Anchorage, Alaska
  Whitby and  Waimea, Hawaii
  Winchester and  Winchester, Virginia
  Wirral, Metropolitan Borough of and  Midland, Texas
  Wolverhampton and  Buffalo, New York
  Worcester and  Worcester, Massachusetts

Scotland and the United States

  Aberdeen and  Aberdeen, Washington
  Aberdeen and  Houston, Texas
  Blairgowrie and  Pleasanton, California
  Dundee and  Alexandria, Virginia
  Dunfermline and  Sarasota, Florida
  Edinburgh and  San Diego, California
  Inverness and  Inverness, Florida
  Livingston and  Grapevine, Texas
  Midlothian and  Midlothian, Illinois
  Prestwick and  Vandalia, Ohio
  Stirling and  Dunedin, Florida
  Stornoway and  Pendleton, South Carolina
  Dull, Perth and Kinross and  Boring, Oregon
  Birnam and  Asheville
  Dumfries and  Annapolis, Maryland
  Dunbar and  Martinez, California
  Dunkeld and  Asheville, North Carolina
  Falkirk and  San Rafael, California
  Forres and  Mount Dora, Florida
  Glasgow and  Pittsburgh
  Grangemouth and  La Porte, Indiana
  Kelso, Scottish Borders and  Kelso, Washington
  Oban and  Laurinburg, North Carolina
  South Ayrshire and  Newnan, Georgia
  Stonehaven and  Athens, Alabama
  Stornoway and  Pendleton, South Carolina
  Linlithgow and  Grapevine, Texas

Wales and the United States
  Brecon and  Saline, Michigan
  Machynlleth and  Belleville, Michigan
  Nantyglo and  Nanty Glo, Pennsylvania
  Newport, Pembrokeshire, and  Annapolis, Maryland

Northern Ireland and the United States

 Ballymena and  Morehead, Kentucky
 Bangor, County Down and  Virginia Beach, Virginia
 Belfast and  Belfast, Maine
 Belfast and  Boston, Massachusetts
 Belfast and  Nashville, Tennessee
 Carrickfergus and  Anderson, South Carolina
 Carrickfergus and  Jackson, Michigan
 Castlereagh and  Kent, Washington
 Craigavon and  LaGrange, Georgia
 Derry and  Buffalo, New York
 Killyleagh and  Cleveland, North Carolina
 Larne and  Clover, South Carolina
 Newtownabbey and  Gilbert, Arizona

British Crown Dependencies and the United States 
  Saint Helier, Jersey and  Trenton, New Jersey

Friendship links
  Liverpool and  Memphis, Tennessee
  Liverpool and  New Orleans, Louisiana
  Newcastle upon Tyne and  Little Rock, Arkansas
  Wellingborough and  Willingboro, New Jersey

Heritage

The United States and Britain share many threads of cultural heritage.

Since English is the main language of both the British and the Americans, both nations belong to the English-speaking world. Their common language comes with (relatively minor) differences in spelling, pronunciation, and the meaning of words.

The American legal system is largely based on English common law. The American system of local government is rooted in English precedents, such as the offices of county courts and sheriffs. Although the US remains more highly religious than Britain, the largest Protestant denominations emerged from British churches brought across the Atlantic, such as the Baptists, Methodists, Congregationalists and Episcopalians.

Britain and the United States practice what is commonly referred to as an Anglo-Saxon economy in which levels of regulation and taxes are relatively low, and government provides a low to medium level of social services in return.

Independence Day, July 4, is a national celebration which commemorates the July 4, 1776, adoption of the Declaration of Independence from the British Empire. American defiance of Britain is expressed in the American national anthem, "The Star-Spangled Banner", written during the War of 1812 to the tune of a British celebratory song as the Americans beat off a British attack on Baltimore.

It is estimated that between 40.2 million and 72.1 million Americans today have British ancestry, i.e. between 13% and 23.3% of the US population. In the 1980 US Census, 61,311,449 Americans reported British ancestry reaching 32.56% of the US population at the time which, even today, would make them the largest ancestry group in the United States.

Particular symbols of the close relationship between the two countries are the JFK Memorial and the American Bar Association's Magna Carta Memorial, both at Runnymede in England.

Religion 

Both the United States and the United Kingdom share the similarity that a majority of their populations state that their belief is Christian, at 70.4% in the US and 59.5% in the UK. Also, in both countries the majority of Christian followers are members of the mainline Protestant group of churches, rather than the Roman Catholic Church, although the Catholic church is relatively sizeable in both countries. Many of these mainline Protestant churches in the United States have their origins in the United Kingdom or their founders were British. This includes Episcopal (Anglican), Baptist, Methodist, Presbyterian, Congregational, and Quaker.

Nevertheless, there are some three big disparities between the two nations in the role of religion and faith. Firstly, the United Kingdom has an established church in two of the four nations of the country; the Anglican Church of England, where the head of state is the head of the church in one, and the Presbyterian Church of Scotland which plays a notable role of the other. The United States on the other hand requires a strict separation of church and state, as stated in the First Amendment.

Another sizable difference between the US and the UK is the piety of followers, as the UK is much more secular than the US. A Gallup poll in 2015 reported that 41% of Americans said they regularly attend religious services, compared to just 10% of Britons. Thirdly, a preeminent distinction amidst the two countries is the declaration of faith. In the United Kingdom, religion, especially those that follow the mainstream Protestant churches, is rarely discussed and the country is a secular society. However, in the US, religion and faith are seen as a major part of the personal being and declarations are much more stronger.

The United Kingdom also has a large number of those possessing no faith or are agnostic with 25.7% saying they are irreligious, compared with just 10% in the United States who say that they don't believe in a God. Many notable British atheists including Richard Dawkins and Christopher Hitchens are known in the US. The Atheist Bus campaign which started in London in 2008 by Ariane Sherine, was copied by local atheists in America and put on buses in Washington, D.C. and the Bloomington, Indiana.

The differing attitudes towards the religion among the US and the UK causes a large schism between the two nations, and much of the general attitude of the society as a whole on fundamental social issues including abortion, minority rights, blasphemy, the role of church and the state in society, etc.

Both the United States and the United Kingdom share a number of followers of other minority faiths, although the numbers and type of faith practice in both countries differ wildly due to the ethnic and cultural makeup of both countries. The other minority faiths that are practiced in both countries include Judaism, Islam, Hinduism, Sikhism, Paganism and Buddhism.

Food and drink 
Many classic dishes or foods from American cuisine such as hamburgers, hot dogs, barbecue chicken, southern fried chicken, deep-pan pizza, chewing gum, tomato soup, chilli-con-carne, chocolate chip cookies, chocolate brownies, soft-scoop ice cream and donuts are popular in the United Kingdom. Drinks like cola, milkshakes and bourbon are also popular. A number of major American food trends and fads have also been popular and influential in the British palate, for example weight management diets and craft beer.

Some American foods, like cornflakes, baked beans and crisps (known as potato chips in the United States), have become so entrenched in the UK's food culture that they have completely lost their American roots and are considered part of British cuisine. Breakfast cereals like corn flakes, bran flakes and puffed rice came from the US to the UK in the beginning of twentieth century, and virtually changed the perception of breakfasts locally.

Some British foods have been just as nativised in the US such as apple pie, macaroni and cheese and sandwiches. British cuisine was a major influence on the cuisine of the Southern United States, including fried chicken. British foods like fish and chips, shepherd's pie, Sunday Roast, Afternoon Tea and gingerbread are also entrenched in American food culture. Drinking culture in the US has been heavily influenced by Britain, especially the introduction of whisky and certain styles of beer in the colonial period. By the late 20th Century, British cuisine was sometimes stereotyped as being unappealing in the United States, although British cuisine is commonly eaten there. This reputation has been attributed to the impact that WWII rationing had on British cuisine in the mid-20th Century.

Many major American food and fast moving consumer goods companies have British operations including Molson Coors, McCormick & Company, Kellogg's, Campbell's, Kraft-Heinz, PepsiCo, Coca-Cola & Mondelez The major British food manufacturers that operate in the United States are Unilever, Associated British Foods and Diageo. The purchase of the British food company Cadbury's by the American company Kraft Foods in 2010,  caused a storm on whether the company would change the recipe for its signature chocolate and the conditions at Cadbury's food factories.

Additionally, there are several American restaurant and café chains like McDonald's, Burger King, KFC, Domino's Pizza, Pizza Hut, Krispy Kreme, and Starbucks that have enterprises on the other side of the Atlantic. A small number of British chains like Pret a Manger, YO! Sushi and Itsu have operations in the US, principally around New York City. The British catering company Compass Group has several catering contracts in the States, including for the federal government and US military.

Since the 2016 EU referendum, there has been growing concern about whether in a possible UK–US free trade agreement would lead to changes in food practices and laws in the UK. The concern is that American food standards laws are much looser than the UK's, such as rules governing cleanliness, the use of antibiotics and pesticides, animal welfare conditions and the use of genetically modified food.  Many of these concerns have been symbolised by the production process of American poultry, often known as "chlorinated chicken".

Culture and media

Both the US and UK are considered "cultural superpowers", with both countries having a large scale influence around the world in film, music, literature, and television.

Literature

Literature is transferred across the Atlantic Ocean, as evidenced by the appeal of British authors such as William Shakespeare, Charles Dickens, J. R. R. Tolkien, Jackie Collins, and J. K. Rowling in the United States, and American authors such as Harriet Beecher Stowe, Mark Twain, Ernest Hemingway, Stephen King and Dan Brown in Britain. Henry James moved to Britain and was well known in both countries, as was T. S. Eliot. Eliot moved to England in 1914 and became a British subject in 1927. He was a dominant figure in literary criticism and greatly influenced the Modern period of British literature.

In the UK, many noted American novels including The Catcher in the Rye, Roll of Thunder, Hear my Cry, Of Mice & Men, & The Color Purple are frequently used texts for British secondary-level education English and English Literature exams as set by the main examination boards.

Press 

In area of press, connections between the US and the UK in terms of print content there is slight, however it is strong in online content. Until 2016, a condensed version of The New York Times was inside The Observer newspaper. In some newsagents in the UK, you can find international editions of USA Today, The New York Times International Edition, the Europe edition of Time, Newsweek, The New Yorker, New York magazine and Foreign Affairs. While in the US you would be able to find the international edition of The Economist and in New York City, the Financial Times. After Rupert Murdoch's purchase of the New York Post in November 1976, he redesigned the newspaper into a populist right-wing tabloid, likewise his earlier relaunch of the British Sun newspaper as a down-market tabloid from 1969.

In magazine publishing, the two big American magazine publishing houses of Hearst and Condé Nast have operations in the UK, with British editions of Good Housekeeping, GQ, Men's Health, Cosmopolitan, Vogue, National Geographic and Wired among others. On occasions, some of the American editions are also available for purchase usually next to the local edition or in the international section. In British magazines in the US, Northern & Shell has since 2005 created an American version of OK! magazine.

There are a number of Americans and British in each other countries' press corp, including editors, correspondents, journalists and columnists. Individuals born in the United States active in the British press corp include the FTs news editor Peter Spiegel, Daily Telegraph columnist Janet Daley, and Guardian columnists Tim Dowling and Hadley Freeman. Originally from the UK were Christopher Hitchens (1949–2011) and the current editor of Vogue, Anna Wintour. The current CEO of The New York Times Company is the former Director-General of the BBC (effectively a CEO), Mark Thompson. The current editor-in-chief of the London-based Guardian since 2015, Katharine Viner was previously the editor of The Guardians American website between 2014 and 2015.

In terms of online content, three newspaper-online sites have American editions, TheGuardian.com, Mail Online and The Independent. BBC News Online is a frequently visited by Americans. The American online news sites BuzzFeed, Breitbart News and HuffPost (formerly The Huffington Post) all possess British-based editions.

Film

There is much crossover appeal in the modern entertainment culture of the United Kingdom and the United States. For example, Hollywood blockbuster movies made by Steven Spielberg and George Lucas have had a large effect on British audiences in the United Kingdom, while the James Bond and Harry Potter series of films have attracted high interest in the United States. Also, the animated films of Walt Disney as well as those of Pixar, DreamWorks, Don Bluth, Blue Sky, Illumination and others have continued to make an indelible mark and impression on British audiences, young and old, for almost 100 years. Films by Alfred Hitchcock continuously make a lasting impact on a loyal fan base in the United States, as Alfred Hitchcock himself influenced notable American filmmakers such as John Carpenter, in the horror and slasher film genres.

Production of films are often shared between the two nations, whether it be a concentrated use of British and American actors or the use of film studios located in London or Hollywood.

Theatre
Broadway theatre in New York City has toured London's West End theatre over the years, with notable performances such as The Lion King, Grease, Wicked, and Rent. British productions, such as Mamma Mia! and several of Andrew Lloyd Webber's musicals, including Joseph and the Amazing Technicolor Dreamcoat, Cats and The Phantom of the Opera have found success on Broadway. For over 150 years, Shakespeare's plays have been overwhelmingly popular with upscale American audiences.

Television

Both the United Kingdom and the United States have television shows which are similar, as they are either carried by the other nations' networks, or are re-created for distribution in their own nations. Some popular British television programmes that were re-created for the American market in more recent years include House of Cards, The Office, Pop Idol (American Idol), Strictly Come Dancing (Dancing with the Stars), Top Gear, Who Wants to Be a Millionaire?, Weakest Link and The X Factor. Some American television shows re-created for the British market in more recent years include The Apprentice and Deal or No Deal. Many American television shows have been popular in the United Kingdom.

The BBC airs two networks in the United States, BBC America and BBC World News. The American network PBS collaborates with the BBC and rebroadcasts British television shows in the United States such as Doctor Who, Keeping Up Appearances, Masterpiece Theatre, Monty Python's Flying Circus, Nova. The BBC also frequently collaborates with American network HBO, showing recent American mini-series in the United Kingdom such as Band of Brothers, The Gathering Storm, John Adams, and Rome. Likewise, the American network Discovery Channel has partnered with the BBC by televising recent British mini-series in the United States such as Planet Earth and The Blue Planet, the latter popularly known as The Blue Planet: Seas of Life in the American format. The United States' public affairs channel C-SPAN, broadcasts Prime Minister's Questions every Sunday.

On some British digital television platforms, it is also possible to watch American television channels that are tailored for British audiences such as CNBC Europe, CNN International, ESPN Classic, Comedy Central, PBS America and Fox. The Super Bowl, the National Football League's championship tournament of American football which occurs every February, has been broadcast in the United Kingdom since 1982. Conversely, the Premier League has been shown on NBC Sports Network in the United States. Until 2017, Formula One television coverage in the United States has used an American-based team but the announcers are British; from 2018 Sky Sports has taken over Formula One coverage through ESPN2.

Radio 

Compared to music and television broadcasting, radio broadcasting is limited between both sides of the pond. There are several reasons for this. The major one is that the majority of radio broadcasting in the United States is commercial and funded by advertising and the small network of public radio stations are supported by donations, compared to the United Kingdom where the national public broadcaster, the BBC is the major player which funded by the obligatory television licence. This leads to a completely different structure of number and type of radio stations and its broadcasting schedules.

Other factors include differing technical standards of radio broadcasting. This is influenced by their countries' broadcasting authorities which shapes over-the-air radio. In the UK, it is influenced by authorities of Ofcom and the EBU which are working towards DAB and DRM. While in the United States, it influenced by FCC which is working towards HD Radio.

The British international broadcasting station, the BBC World Service is syndicated on various major city public radio stations in the United States such as WNYC, and on SiriusXM satellite radio, through the broadcaster American Public Media. The American international broadcaster, Voice of America has no remit in be needed to be heard in the UK, so it doesn't broadcast there and none of its programmes is relayed on domestic stations. In a resource-saving exercise between the two international broadcasters, Voice of America shares its transmission towers with the BBC World Service to help of shortwave transmissions in remote areas.

Internet radio and streaming services are growing in popularity in both countries, however listening to each other's feeds are hampered by the countries' broadcasting rights. This causes the internet radio feeds of American and British radio stations are sometimes blocked or on restricted bandwidth. For example, BBC Radio 2 is on a 128 kbit/s AAC domestic stream, while internationally it's on a 48 kbit/s AAC+ stream. However both the American and the British international broadcasters Voice of America and the BBC World Service is fully accessible online in each other's countries. Streaming services that are popular in both countries include the American TuneIn, Apple Music and Swedish-owned Spotify. The other major services in the US like Pandora Radio and Radio.com don't operate in the UK, and are inaccessible.

In the past before the Second World War, connections between the United States and the United Kingdom in the radio industry was virtually unheard of. Radio in the UK was not influenced by the US, due to the vast distance, and the only regular services that were heard was the BBC and the "pirate" station Radio Luxembourg.

When the Americans joined the war as part of the Allies, some soldiers were billeted in the UK in which the BBC provided programming for these people. So the Forces Programme, broadcast many popular American variety shows such as Charlie McCarthy, The Bob Hope Show, and The Jack Benny Program. As the Forces Programme, and the subsequent General Forces Programme, was easily available for civilians they were also heard by domestic audiences.

After the War in 1946 on the Home Service, the BBC started to broadcast the factual programme Letter from America, which was presented by Alistair Cooke, bring informing about the States to British audiences until Cook's death in 2004.  It was one of the BBC's longest-running radio programmes, broadcasting on the Home Service, and continuing on BBC Radio 4. It was also relayed on the BBC World Service. The programme itself was based on a similar programme by Alistair Cooke in the 1930s for American listeners about life in the UK on the NBC Red Network. After Letter from America, the BBC continued with a factual programme about the States in Americana from 2009 to 2011, presented by the resident American correspondent.

As of 2019, the BBC co-produced with Public Radio International and WGBH Boston, a weekly factual programme called The World, which is broadcast on various American public radio stations. Parts of the show are put together for a shorter programme called Boston Calling, which is available on Radio 4 and the domestic feed of the World Service.  There have been attempts in the past to bring British formats to American audiences, such as the News Quiz USA.  From 2005 to 2011, a time-shifted version of BBC Radio 1 was available on Sirius satellite radio.  While in the UK, A Prairie Home Companion (called Garrison Keillor's Radio Show) was available weekly from 2002 on BBC7 to 2016, on BBC Radio 4 Extra.

There has been a number of American personalities that have been on British airwaves including music journalist Paul Gambaccini, disc jockey Suzi Quattro and comedians Rich Hall and Greg Proops. While New Zealand-born disc jockey Zane Lowe, who spent much of career in the UK was recruited to Apple's Beats 1 station in the United States.

Music

American artists such as Whitney Houston, Madonna, Tina Turner, Cher, Michael Jackson, Janet Jackson, Mariah Carey, Bing Crosby, Elvis Presley, Bob Dylan, Jimi Hendrix, Guns N' Roses, Diana Ross, Britney Spears, Christina Aguilera, Frank Sinatra, Lady Gaga, Taylor Swift and Beyoncé, are popular in the United Kingdom. British artists such as The Beatles, Led Zeppelin, The Rolling Stones, Sting, The Who, Queen, Shirley Bassey, Tom Jones, David Bowie, Pink Floyd, Rod Stewart, the Spice Girls, the Bee Gees, Amy Winehouse, KT Tunstall, Leona Lewis, Elton John (Elton John recorded "Candle in the Wind" which, to date, is the best ever selling single worldwide), Coldplay and Adele have achieved much success in the large American market. Undoubtedly, the popular music of both nations has had a strong sway on each other.

In the United Kingdom, many Hollywood films as well as Broadway musicals are closely associated and identified with the musical scores and soundtracks created by famous American composers such as George Gershwin, Rodgers and Hammerstein, Henry Mancini, John Williams, Alan Silvestri, Jerry Goldsmith, and James Horner.

The Celtic music of the United Kingdom has had a dynamic effect upon American music. In particular, the traditional music of the Southern United States is descended from traditional Celtic music and English folk music of the colonial period, and the musical traditions of the South eventually gave rise to country music and, to a lesser extent, American folk.

The birth of jazz, swing, big band, and especially rock and roll, all developed and originating in the United States, had greatly influenced the later development of rock music in the United Kingdom, particularly British rock bands such as The Beatles and Herman's Hermits, The Rolling Stones, while its American precursor, the blues, greatly influenced British electric rock.

Sports 

Despite sports being a major cultural interest in both the United States and the United Kingdom, there is little overlap in their most popular sports. The most popular team sports in the UK are football (soccer), rugby union, rugby league and cricket, while the most popular sports in the US are [American] football, baseball, ice hockey and basketball. The most popular sports in each country are considered minor sports in the other, with growing interest. Both nations are among the strongest in the world in all time sporting success, with the United States being the most successful sports nation in the world.

Association football 

In the current 2019-2020 season, three Americans are in the FA's top-tier Premier League: Cameron Carter-Vickers (Celtic), Christian Pulisic (Chelsea), and DeAndre Yedlin (Newcastle United). All three players play for the U. S. national team, although only Pulisic is on the current team, while the others are in reserve.  The current team also has two more players from the second tier EFL Championship, Tim Ream (Fulham) and Matt Miagza (Reading).

In the current Major League Soccer 2019 season, there are eight English players playing; Mo Adams (Atlanta United), Jack Elliott (Philadelphia Union), Michael Mancienne (New England Revolution), Luke Mulholland (Real Salt Lake), Nedum Onuoha (Real Salt Lake), Dion Pereira (Atlanta United), Jack Price (Colorado Rapids), and Bradley Wright-Phillips (New York Red Bulls). There are also four Scottish players playing in the 2019 season; Gary Mackay-Steven (New York City FC), Sam Nicholson (Colorado Rapids), Johnny Russell (Sporting Kansas City) & Danny Wilson (Colorado Rapids). Only Johnny Russell currently plays for the Scottish national team, while none of the English players play for their national team. The most noted former English players are former national team captains David Beckham, who played from 2007 to 2012 for the LA Galaxy, and Wayne Rooney, who played from 2018 to 2020 for DC United.

The  men's national teams of England and the US played at the 2010 World Cup in South Africa. The match ended in a 1–1 draw. They also recently played in the 2022 World Cup, with their match ending in a 0-0 draw. Along with the 1950 World Cup win for the US over England, the US has played England at the World Cup 3 times and remains undefeated against them. The Premier League can be watched in the United States on NBC Sports, while a few MLS games can be watched in the UK on Sky Sports.

Five US Women's National Team players currently play in the Football Association Women's Super League: Alex Morgan (Tottenham Hotspur F.C. Women), Christen Press (Manchester United W.F.C.), Tobin Heath (Manchester United W.F.C.), Rose Lavelle (Manchester City W.F.C.), and Samantha Mewis (Manchester City W.F.C.).

The National Women's Soccer League currently hosts two English players, Rachel Daly (Houston Dash), and Jodie Taylor (OL Reign), as well as two Scottish players, Rachel Corsie (Utah Royals FC), and Claire Emslie (Orlando Pride), and one Welsh player, Jess Fishlock (OL Reign).

The last competitive match between the women's national teams of England and the US was during the 2020 SheBelieves Cup in Orlando, Florida, on March 5, 2020. The United States women's national soccer team won by 2 goals, with one goal from Christen Press, and the other from Carli Lloyd. The England women's national football team did not score. The United States women's national soccer team went on to win the title, defeating the Japan women's national football team in the final.

American football 

Gridiron football, which is known in the United Kingdom as American football, originated from two British sports, association football and rugby union football. It came about in the later part of the 19th century due to the development into a separate code and led to becoming a separate sport from the other codes of football. Gridiron was in the past only known and played in UK by visiting American servicemen; firstly in 1910, by navy crews from USS Georgia, USS Idaho and USS Vermont, and then in the Second World War by UK-based service personnel. (The other gridiron code, Canadian football, is hardly known in UK.)

It was not until the TV network Channel 4 started showing the highlights of the American NFL in 1982, that the sport became acknowledged by the British sporting world. Due to unfamiliarity of the sport, television guides and newspapers had printed out guides explaining the sport. A year later, the first match between two British teams the London Ravens and the Northwich Spartans was played, in that game the Ravens won. Later in the 1980s, the sport grew and rival teams started to play, which was helped by support from various American players,  coaches and sponsors like Coca-Cola & Budweiser. In 1986, the first ever official NFL game to play at the home of English sport, Wembley between the Chicago Bears and the Dallas Cowboys.

However, by the early 1990s due to the recession, Channel 4 stopping regular showings of the NFL in 1997 and falling interest, it lost its popularity. Nevertheless, the Super Bowl has continued been regularly shown on British television and the NFL has been broadcast by other broadcasters including ITV, Channel 5, ESPN UK, British Eurosport and the current broadcaster, Sky Sports.

In 2007 the NFL returned to Wembley with a regular season game between the Miami Dolphins and the New York Giants. There has been a further games played at Wembley since with an average attendance of well over 80,000. Due to this, there has also been growing interest to set up a resident NFL franchise in London, with Jacksonville Jaguars being the most likely team to relocate to the city. As of 2019, noted currently playing British gridiron players are Carolina Panthers defensive end, Nigerian-born Efe Obada and Atlanta Falcons tight end, Alex Grey.

Baseball 

The first recorded writings about a sport called "base-ball" came in the mid-18th century when a version of the sport played indoors in 1748 in London, where it was played by then Prince of Wales, George III, and played outside in 1755 in the southern English town of Guildford.  It was later brought over to the United States by British immigrants, where it developed in the modern version of the sport in the early 19th century in the creation and fountain of the modern baseball rule book, the Knickerbocker Rules in 1845. Eventually, it suppressed the popularity of the other notable ball-and-bat sport which was played in the US at the time which was cricket, by the end of the 19th century.

Sheffield born Harry Wright was instrumental in the development of professional baseball in the United States, and he brought his touring team to Britain to promote the sport. Later, at the end of the 19th century Francis Ley, a Derby man claimed erroneously to have had 'discovered' the game on a trip to the United States, and Albert Goodwill Spalding, an American former star player and sporting goods businessman who saw opportunities to expand his business across the Atlantic, funded a second tour to the United Kingdom (Spalding had earlier toured under Wright’s leadership). This continued with the establishment of the 1890 National League of Baseball of Great Britain, the first professional league in Britain. Baseball clubs were formed from well known Association Football clubs Aston Villa, Stoke City and Preston North End, who were joined by Ley’s own Derby Baseball Club.

Like the other noted American sport of gridiron, during the First World War visiting US service personnel from the US Army and Navy did a demonstration game at Chelsea's Stamford Bridge in 1918. This was received to a crowd of 38,000 people which even included the king George V. This led to into a growing interest in the game across the Atlantic, and baseball teams were created during the inter-wars. This led to a peak in 1938 when there was a victory by Great Britain over the United States in the 1938 Amateur World Series which was held in England, which is considered the first World Cup of Baseball.

The popularity of baseball in the United Kingdom diminished during and after the Second World War by other sports and today, baseball isn't widely played among Britons. Notwithstanding, Major League Baseball  and the show Baseball Tonight are available to watch the United Kingdom on the BT Sport ESPN channel. On a growing back of interest in American sports, in 2018 Major League Baseball agreed a two-year deal to field four games a year during the 2019 and 2020 seasons at the London Stadium under the name 2019 MLB London Series. The games are between the four big teams; the New York Yankees, the Boston Red Sox, the Chicago Cubs and the St Louis Cardinals. These games are available to watch not just on BT Sport, but also the BBC. John Spinks, leader of rock band The Outfield, was a notable British fan of baseball, whose terminology he used to name his band.

Gallery

See also

 Anglophilia & Anglophobia
 Anti-Americanism
 Foreign policy of the United States
 Foreign relations of the United Kingdom
 Foreign relations of the United States
 Great Rapprochement
 Special Relationship
 Timeline of British diplomatic history
 Timeline of United States diplomatic history
 Transatlantic relations
 UKUSA Agreement, on sharing secret intelligence
 United Kingdom–United States relations in World War II
 United Kingdom - United States Free Trade Agreement

Notes

References

Bibliography

To 1945

 Allen, H. C. Great Britain and the United States: A History of Anglo-American Relations, 1783–1952 (1954), 1032pp. online; most thorough scholarly coverage
 Bailey, Thomas A. A Diplomatic History of the American People (10th edition 1980) online free to borrow.
 Burk, Kathleen. The Lion and the Eagle. The Interaction of the British and American Empires 1783-1972 (2018) online review
 Burk, Kathleen. Old World, New World. The Story of Britain and America (2009) online review.
 Burt, Alfred L. The United States, Great Britain, and British North America from the Revolution to the Establishment of Peace after the War of 1812 (1940), detailed history by Canadian scholar.
 Campbell, Charles S. Anglo-American Understanding 1898–1903 (1957)
 Charmley, John. Churchill's Grand Alliance: The Anglo-American Special Relationship 1940–57 (1996)
 Collier, Basil. The lion and the eagle; British and Anglo-American strategy, 1900-1950 (1972) online free to borrow
 Cook, James Gwin. Anglophobia: An Analysis of Anti-British Prejudice in the United States (1919) online free
 Crawford, Martin. The Anglo-American Crisis of the Mid-Nineteenth Century: The Times and America, 1850–1862 (1987)
 Cullinane, Michael Patrick. "100 Years of Peace among English‐Speaking People: Anglo‐American Cultural Diplomacy, 1909–1921." Peace & Change 46.1 (2021): 5-34.
 Dobson, Alan P. Anglo-American Relations in the Twentieth Century (1995).
 Dumbrell, John. A special relationship: Anglo-American relations from the cold war to Iraq (2006)
 Dunning, William Archibald. The British Empire and the United States (1914) online celebratory study by leading American scholar, written before World War I began.
 Ellis, Sylvia. Historical Dictionary of Anglo-American Relations (2009) and text search
 Foreman, Amanda. A World on Fire: Britain's Crucial Role in the American Civil War (Random House, 2011), 958 pp.
 Geoffrey Wheatcroft, "How the British Nearly Supported the Confederacy," New York Times Sunday Book Review June 30, 2011 online
 Hollowell; Jonathan. Twentieth-Century Anglo-American Relations (2001)
 Hitchens, Christopher. Blood, Class and Empire: The Enduring Anglo-American Relationship (2004)
 Kaufman, Will, and Heidi Slettedahl Macpherson, eds. Britain and the Americas: Culture, Politics, and History (3 vol 2005), 1157pp; encyclopedic coverage
 Lane, Ann. Strategy, Diplomacy and UK Foreign Policy (Palgrave Macmillan, 2010)
 Louis, William Roger. Imperialism at Bay: The United States and the Decolonization of the British Empire, 1941–1945 (1978)
 MacKenzie, Scott A. "But There Was No War: The Impossibility of a United States Invasion of Canada after the Civil War" American Review of Canadian Studies (2017) online
 McKercher, B. J. C. Transition of Power: Britain's Loss of Global Pre-eminence to the United States, 1930-1945 (1999) 403pp
  Masterson, William H. Tories and Democrats : British diplomats in pre-Jacksonian America (1985) online
 Mowat, R. B.  The diplomatic relations of Great Britain and the United States  (1925).online free; scholarly survey; 350pp
 Ovendale, Ritchie. Anglo-American Relations in the Twentieth Century (1998)
 Pederson, William D. ed. A Companion to Franklin D. Roosevelt (2011) pp 493–516, covers FDR's policies to 1945
 Perkins, Bradford. The First Rapprochement: England and the United States, 1795–1805 (1955)
 Perkins, Bradford. Prologue to war: England and the United States, 1805–1812  (1961) online
 Perkins, Bradford. Castlereagh and Adams : England and the United States, 1812-1823 (1964) online
 Perkins, Bradford. The great rapprochement; England and the United States, 1895-1914 (1968) online
 Perkins, Edwin J. Financing Anglo-American trade: The House of Brown, 1800–1880 (1975)
 Peskin, Lawrence A. "Conspiratorial Anglophobia and the War of 1812." Journal of American History 98#3 (2011): 647–669. online
 Rakestraw, Donald A. For Honor or Destiny: The Anglo-American Crisis over the Oregon Territory (Peter Lang Publishing, 1995)
 Pletcher, David M. The Diplomacy of Annexation: Texas, Oregon, and the Mexican War (U of Missouri Press, 1973) online
 Reid, Brian Holden. "Power, Sovereignty, and the Great Republic: Anglo-American Diplomatic Relations in the Era of the Civil War" Diplomacy & Statecraft (2003) 14#2 pp 45–76.
 Reid, Brian Holden. "'A Signpost That Was Missed'? Reconsidering British Lessons from the American Civil War," Journal of Military History 70#2 (2006), pp. 385–414
 Reynolds, David. From World War to Cold War: Churchill, Roosevelt, and the International History of the 1940s (2007) excerpt and text search
 Schake, Kori. Safe Passage: The Transition from British to American Hegemony (2017) excerpt
 Tilchin, William N. Theodore Roosevelt and the British Empire: A Study in Presidential Statecraft (1997)
 Tuffnell, Stephen. ""Uncle Sam is to be Sacrificed": Anglophobia in Late Nineteenth-Century Politics and Culture." American Nineteenth Century History 12#1 (2011): 77-99.
 Tulloch, Hugh A. "Changing British attitudes towards the United States in the 1880s." Historical Journal 20.4 (1977): 825–840. online
 Watt,  D. Cameron. Succeeding John Bull: America in Britain's place 1900–1975: a study of the Anglo-American relationship and world politics in the context of British and American foreign-policy-making in the twentieth century (1984). 302pp. online
 Williams, Andrew J. France, Britain and the United States in the Twentieth Century 1900–1940 (2014). 133–171.
 Woods, Randall Bennett. Changing of the Guard: Anglo-American Relations, 1941–1946 (1990)
 Woodward,  David R.  Anglo-American Relations. 1917-1918 (1993) complete book online

Since 1940; Special relationship

 Abrahamian, Ervand. A History of Modern Iran (2008).
 Bartlett, Christopher John. The Special Relationship: A Political History of Anglo-American Relations Since 1945 (1992).
 Baylis, John. Anglo-American Defence Relations 1939–1984: The Special Relationship (1984)
 Brinton, Crane, The United States and Britain (1945) online focus on World War II
 Bullock, Alan. Ernest Bevin: Foreign Secretary 1945-1951 (1984) online
 Coker, Christopher. "Britain and the new world order: the special relationship in the 1990s," International Affairs  (1992): 407–421. in JSTOR
 Colman, Jonathan.  A 'Special Relationship'?: Harold Wilson, Lyndon B. Johnson and Anglo-American Relations' at the Summit, 1964-8 (Manchester University Press, 2004)
 Dimbleby, David, and David Reynolds. An Ocean Apart: The Relationship Between Britain and America in the Twentieth Century (1988)
 Dobson, Alan and Steve Marsh.  "Anglo-American Relations: End of a Special Relationship?"  International History Review 36:4 (August 2014):  673–697.  DOI:  10.1080/07075332.2013.836124.  online review argues it is still in effect
 Dobson, Alan J. The Politics of the Anglo-American Economic Special Relationship (1988)
 Dobson, Alan. "The special relationship and European integration." Diplomacy and Statecraft (1991) 2#1 79–102.
 Dumbrell, John. A Special Relationship: Anglo-American Relations in the Cold War and After (2ndd ed. 2006).
 Dumbrell, John. "The US–UK Special Relationship: Taking the 21st-Century Temperature." The British Journal of Politics & International Relations (2009) 11#1 pp: 64–78. online
 Glancy, Mark. "Temporary American citizens? British audiences, Hollywood films and the threat of Americanisation in the 1920s." Historical Journal of Film, Radio and Television (2006) 26#4 pp 461–484.
 Hendershot, Robert M. Family Spats: Perception, Illusion, and Sentimentality in the Anglo-American Special Relationship (2008).
 Holmes, Alison R. and J. Rofe, eds. The Embassy in Grosvenor Square: American Ambassadors to the United Kingdom, 1938-2008 (2012)
 
 Johnsen, William Thomas. The Origins of the Grand Alliance: Anglo-American Military Collaboration from the Panay Incident to Pearl Harbor (2016). 438 pp. online review
  Law, Michael John. Not Like Home: American Visitors to Britain in the 1950s (McGill-Queen's University Press, 2019) Online book review
 Louis, William Roger, and Hedley Bull, eds The "Special Relationship": Anglo-American Relations since 1945 (1987), 25 scholarly essays by British and American experts.
 Lyons, John F. America in the British Imagination: 1945 to the Present (Palgrave Macmillan, 2013).
 Malchow, H.L. Special Relations: The Americanization of Britain? (Stanford University Press; 2011) 400 pages; explores American influence on the culture and counterculture of metropolitan London from the 1950s to the 1970s, from "Swinging London" to black, feminist, and gay liberation. excerpt and text search
Pells, Richard. Not like Us: How Europeans Have Loved, Hated and Transformed American Culture since World War  II (1997) online
 Ratti, Luca. Not-So-Special Relationship: The US, The UK and German Unification, 1945-1990 (Edinburgh UP, 2017).
 Reynolds, David. Rich relations: the American occupation of Britain, 1942-1945 (1995) online
 Reynolds, David. "A 'special relationship'? America, Britain and the international order since the Second World War." International Affairs (1985): 1-20.
 Rofe, J. Simon and Alison R. Holmes, eds. The Embassy in Grosvenor Square: American Ambassadors to the United Kingdom, 1938-2008 (2012), essays by scholars how the ambassadors promoted a special relationship
 Shawcross, William. Allies: The U.S., Britain, Europe and the War in Iraq (2004)
 Watry, David M. Diplomacy at the Brink: Eisenhower, Churchill, and Eden in the Cold War. (Louisiana State UP, 2014).
 Watt, D. Cameron. Succeeding John Bull: America in Britain's place, 1900-1975: a study of the Anglo-American relationship and world politics in the context of British and American foreign-policy-making in the twentieth century (1984) online
 Williams, Paul. British Foreign Policy under New Labour (2005)
 Woolner, David B.  "The Frustrated Idealists: Cordell Hull, Anthony Eden and the Search for Anglo-American Cooperation, 1933–1938" (PhD dissertation, McGill University, 1996) online bibliography pp 373–91.

Primary sources

 Blair, Tony. A Journey: My Political Life (2010), memoir by UK prime minister
 Barnes, James J. and Patience P. Barnes, eds. The American Revolution through British Eyes 2v (2013)
 Barnes, James J. and Patience P. Barnes, eds. The American Civil War through British Eyes: Dispatches from British Diplomats - Vol. 1 (2003) online
 Barnes, James J. and Patience P. Barnes, eds.   Private and Confidential: Letters from British Ministers in Washington to the Foreign Secretaries in London, 1844-1867 (1993)
  Frankel, Robert. Observing America : the commentary of British visitors to the United States, 1890-1950 (2007) online
 Loewenheim, Francis L. et al. eds. Roosevelt and Churchill, their secret wartime correspondence (1975)

Further reading
 W. N Medlicott. British foreign policy since Versailles, 1919-1963 (1968)
  David Sanders and David Houghton. Losing an Empire, Finding a Role: British Foreign Policy Since 1945 (2nd ed. 2017)
 Robert F. Worth, "The End of the Show" (review of James Barr, Lords of the Desert: The Battle Between the United States and Great Britain for Supremacy in the Modern Middle East, Basic Books, 454 pp.; and Derek Leebaert, Grand Improvisation: America Confronts the British Superpower, 1945–1957, Farrar, Straus and Giroux, 612 pp.), The New York Review of Books, vol. LXVI, no. 16 (October 24, 2019), pp. 44–46.

External links

 History of United Kingdom – United States relations from US State Dept.
 Atlantic Archive: UK-US Relations in an Age of Global War 1939–1945
 John Bull and Uncle Sam: Four Centuries of British American Relations
 An analysis of the Special Relationship from a British perspective. From the Second World War to the latest global problems facing the United States.
 Lecture: Anti-Americanism and American Exceptionalism
 Goldwin Smith, "The Hatred of England," (1890) essay by Canadian scholar
 British Embassy in the United States of America
 Embassy of the United States of America in the United Kingdom
 The Woodrow Wilson Center's Nuclear Proliferation International History Project or NPIHP is a global network of individuals and institutions engaged in the study of international nuclear history through archival documents, oral history interviews and other empirical sources.

 
United States
Bilateral relations of the United States
Relations of colonizer and former colony